

24001–24100 

|-bgcolor=#fefefe
| 24001 ||  || — || September 10, 1999 || Višnjan Observatory || K. Korlević || — || align=right | 2.3 km || 
|-id=002 bgcolor=#E9E9E9
| 24002 ||  || — || September 11, 1999 || Višnjan Observatory || K. Korlević || — || align=right | 4.8 km || 
|-id=003 bgcolor=#E9E9E9
| 24003 ||  || — || September 12, 1999 || Višnjan Observatory || K. Korlević || — || align=right | 5.3 km || 
|-id=004 bgcolor=#E9E9E9
| 24004 ||  || — || September 7, 1999 || Socorro || LINEAR || — || align=right | 8.5 km || 
|-id=005 bgcolor=#E9E9E9
| 24005 Eddieozawa ||  ||  || September 7, 1999 || Socorro || LINEAR || — || align=right | 4.4 km || 
|-id=006 bgcolor=#fefefe
| 24006 ||  || — || September 7, 1999 || Socorro || LINEAR || — || align=right | 4.6 km || 
|-id=007 bgcolor=#fefefe
| 24007 ||  || — || September 7, 1999 || Socorro || LINEAR || NYS || align=right | 1.6 km || 
|-id=008 bgcolor=#fefefe
| 24008 ||  || — || September 7, 1999 || Socorro || LINEAR || FLO || align=right | 2.1 km || 
|-id=009 bgcolor=#fefefe
| 24009 ||  || — || September 7, 1999 || Socorro || LINEAR || — || align=right | 3.0 km || 
|-id=010 bgcolor=#fefefe
| 24010 Stovall ||  ||  || September 8, 1999 || Socorro || LINEAR || — || align=right | 1.9 km || 
|-id=011 bgcolor=#E9E9E9
| 24011 ||  || — || September 8, 1999 || Socorro || LINEAR || — || align=right | 3.7 km || 
|-id=012 bgcolor=#E9E9E9
| 24012 ||  || — || September 9, 1999 || Socorro || LINEAR || — || align=right | 3.2 km || 
|-id=013 bgcolor=#E9E9E9
| 24013 ||  || — || September 9, 1999 || Socorro || LINEAR || — || align=right | 7.1 km || 
|-id=014 bgcolor=#E9E9E9
| 24014 ||  || — || September 9, 1999 || Socorro || LINEAR || — || align=right | 6.6 km || 
|-id=015 bgcolor=#fefefe
| 24015 Pascalepinner ||  ||  || September 9, 1999 || Socorro || LINEAR || V || align=right | 1.9 km || 
|-id=016 bgcolor=#E9E9E9
| 24016 ||  || — || September 9, 1999 || Socorro || LINEAR || — || align=right | 3.0 km || 
|-id=017 bgcolor=#E9E9E9
| 24017 ||  || — || September 9, 1999 || Socorro || LINEAR || — || align=right | 3.6 km || 
|-id=018 bgcolor=#C2FFFF
| 24018 ||  || — || September 9, 1999 || Socorro || LINEAR || L5 || align=right | 24 km || 
|-id=019 bgcolor=#fefefe
| 24019 Jeremygasper ||  ||  || September 9, 1999 || Socorro || LINEAR || V || align=right | 2.1 km || 
|-id=020 bgcolor=#fefefe
| 24020 ||  || — || September 9, 1999 || Socorro || LINEAR || — || align=right | 3.6 km || 
|-id=021 bgcolor=#fefefe
| 24021 Yocum ||  ||  || September 9, 1999 || Socorro || LINEAR || V || align=right | 2.3 km || 
|-id=022 bgcolor=#C2FFFF
| 24022 ||  || — || September 9, 1999 || Socorro || LINEAR || L5 || align=right | 21 km || 
|-id=023 bgcolor=#E9E9E9
| 24023 ||  || — || September 9, 1999 || Socorro || LINEAR || — || align=right | 7.8 km || 
|-id=024 bgcolor=#fefefe
| 24024 Lynnejohnson ||  ||  || September 9, 1999 || Socorro || LINEAR || — || align=right | 3.5 km || 
|-id=025 bgcolor=#fefefe
| 24025 Kimwallin ||  ||  || September 9, 1999 || Socorro || LINEAR || FLO || align=right | 2.7 km || 
|-id=026 bgcolor=#fefefe
| 24026 Pusateri ||  ||  || September 9, 1999 || Socorro || LINEAR || — || align=right | 2.4 km || 
|-id=027 bgcolor=#fefefe
| 24027 Downs ||  ||  || September 9, 1999 || Socorro || LINEAR || — || align=right | 5.8 km || 
|-id=028 bgcolor=#E9E9E9
| 24028 Veronicaduys ||  ||  || September 9, 1999 || Socorro || LINEAR || — || align=right | 3.4 km || 
|-id=029 bgcolor=#FA8072
| 24029 ||  || — || September 10, 1999 || Socorro || LINEAR || — || align=right | 5.4 km || 
|-id=030 bgcolor=#d6d6d6
| 24030 ||  || — || September 8, 1999 || Socorro || LINEAR || — || align=right | 8.5 km || 
|-id=031 bgcolor=#E9E9E9
| 24031 ||  || — || September 8, 1999 || Socorro || LINEAR || — || align=right | 3.6 km || 
|-id=032 bgcolor=#E9E9E9
| 24032 Aimeemcarthy ||  ||  || September 8, 1999 || Socorro || LINEAR || — || align=right | 4.7 km || 
|-id=033 bgcolor=#E9E9E9
| 24033 ||  || — || September 8, 1999 || Catalina || CSS || — || align=right | 4.6 km || 
|-id=034 bgcolor=#fefefe
| 24034 ||  || — || September 22, 1999 || Višnjan Observatory || K. Korlević || NYS || align=right | 2.7 km || 
|-id=035 bgcolor=#E9E9E9
| 24035 ||  || — || September 22, 1999 || Višnjan Observatory || K. Korlević || — || align=right | 9.4 km || 
|-id=036 bgcolor=#E9E9E9
| 24036 ||  || — || September 29, 1999 || Višnjan Observatory || K. Korlević || PAE || align=right | 8.8 km || 
|-id=037 bgcolor=#fefefe
| 24037 ||  || — || September 29, 1999 || Socorro || LINEAR || — || align=right | 3.9 km || 
|-id=038 bgcolor=#fefefe
| 24038 ||  || — || September 29, 1999 || Socorro || LINEAR || — || align=right | 4.3 km || 
|-id=039 bgcolor=#fefefe
| 24039 ||  || — || September 29, 1999 || Socorro || LINEAR || — || align=right | 3.9 km || 
|-id=040 bgcolor=#E9E9E9
| 24040 ||  || — || September 29, 1999 || Socorro || LINEAR || — || align=right | 3.4 km || 
|-id=041 bgcolor=#fefefe
| 24041 ||  || — || September 30, 1999 || Socorro || LINEAR || — || align=right | 3.1 km || 
|-id=042 bgcolor=#fefefe
| 24042 ||  || — || September 30, 1999 || Catalina || CSS || H || align=right | 1.7 km || 
|-id=043 bgcolor=#E9E9E9
| 24043 ||  || — || September 30, 1999 || Socorro || LINEAR || — || align=right | 3.5 km || 
|-id=044 bgcolor=#fefefe
| 24044 Caballo ||  ||  || September 30, 1999 || Socorro || LINEAR || V || align=right | 2.1 km || 
|-id=045 bgcolor=#E9E9E9
| 24045 Unruh ||  ||  || September 30, 1999 || Socorro || LINEAR || — || align=right | 3.8 km || 
|-id=046 bgcolor=#fefefe
| 24046 Malovany ||  ||  || October 2, 1999 || Ondřejov || L. Kotková || FLO || align=right | 1.6 km || 
|-id=047 bgcolor=#E9E9E9
| 24047 ||  || — || October 6, 1999 || Stroncone || Santa Lucia Obs. || — || align=right | 3.8 km || 
|-id=048 bgcolor=#fefefe
| 24048 Pedroduque ||  ||  || October 10, 1999 || Ametlla de Mar || J. Nomen || CIM || align=right | 4.1 km || 
|-id=049 bgcolor=#fefefe
| 24049 ||  || — || October 15, 1999 || Višnjan Observatory || K. Korlević || NYS || align=right | 2.6 km || 
|-id=050 bgcolor=#fefefe
| 24050 ||  || — || October 3, 1999 || Socorro || LINEAR || V || align=right | 1.7 km || 
|-id=051 bgcolor=#fefefe
| 24051 Hadinger ||  ||  || October 4, 1999 || Socorro || LINEAR || — || align=right | 1.7 km || 
|-id=052 bgcolor=#fefefe
| 24052 Nguyen ||  ||  || October 4, 1999 || Socorro || LINEAR || — || align=right | 2.5 km || 
|-id=053 bgcolor=#fefefe
| 24053 Shinichiro ||  ||  || October 12, 1999 || Anderson Mesa || LONEOS || — || align=right | 2.0 km || 
|-id=054 bgcolor=#fefefe
| 24054 ||  || — || October 1, 1999 || Catalina || CSS || — || align=right | 2.3 km || 
|-id=055 bgcolor=#E9E9E9
| 24055 ||  || — || October 9, 1999 || Kitt Peak || Spacewatch || — || align=right | 5.8 km || 
|-id=056 bgcolor=#fefefe
| 24056 ||  || — || October 10, 1999 || Kitt Peak || Spacewatch || NYS || align=right | 1.6 km || 
|-id=057 bgcolor=#E9E9E9
| 24057 ||  || — || October 10, 1999 || Kitt Peak || Spacewatch || — || align=right | 2.4 km || 
|-id=058 bgcolor=#fefefe
| 24058 ||  || — || October 2, 1999 || Socorro || LINEAR || — || align=right | 2.5 km || 
|-id=059 bgcolor=#fefefe
| 24059 Halverson ||  ||  || October 2, 1999 || Socorro || LINEAR || — || align=right | 2.3 km || 
|-id=060 bgcolor=#fefefe
| 24060 Schimenti ||  ||  || October 2, 1999 || Socorro || LINEAR || V || align=right | 2.0 km || 
|-id=061 bgcolor=#E9E9E9
| 24061 ||  || — || October 2, 1999 || Socorro || LINEAR || — || align=right | 5.3 km || 
|-id=062 bgcolor=#fefefe
| 24062 Hardister ||  ||  || October 4, 1999 || Socorro || LINEAR || — || align=right | 2.4 km || 
|-id=063 bgcolor=#E9E9E9
| 24063 Nanwoodward ||  ||  || October 4, 1999 || Socorro || LINEAR || — || align=right | 3.2 km || 
|-id=064 bgcolor=#fefefe
| 24064 ||  || — || October 4, 1999 || Socorro || LINEAR || — || align=right | 1.6 km || 
|-id=065 bgcolor=#E9E9E9
| 24065 Barbfriedman ||  ||  || October 4, 1999 || Socorro || LINEAR || — || align=right | 5.3 km || 
|-id=066 bgcolor=#E9E9E9
| 24066 Eriksorensen ||  ||  || October 4, 1999 || Socorro || LINEAR || — || align=right | 2.8 km || 
|-id=067 bgcolor=#E9E9E9
| 24067 ||  || — || October 7, 1999 || Socorro || LINEAR || — || align=right | 3.7 km || 
|-id=068 bgcolor=#E9E9E9
| 24068 Simonsen ||  ||  || October 8, 1999 || Socorro || LINEAR || — || align=right | 3.6 km || 
|-id=069 bgcolor=#E9E9E9
| 24069 Barbarapener ||  ||  || October 10, 1999 || Socorro || LINEAR || — || align=right | 2.4 km || 
|-id=070 bgcolor=#fefefe
| 24070 Toniwest ||  ||  || October 10, 1999 || Socorro || LINEAR || NYS || align=right | 2.1 km || 
|-id=071 bgcolor=#fefefe
| 24071 ||  || — || October 10, 1999 || Socorro || LINEAR || — || align=right | 2.0 km || 
|-id=072 bgcolor=#E9E9E9
| 24072 ||  || — || October 12, 1999 || Socorro || LINEAR || — || align=right | 4.4 km || 
|-id=073 bgcolor=#fefefe
| 24073 ||  || — || October 12, 1999 || Socorro || LINEAR || FLO || align=right | 1.9 km || 
|-id=074 bgcolor=#fefefe
| 24074 Thomasjohnson ||  ||  || October 12, 1999 || Socorro || LINEAR || FLO || align=right | 3.4 km || 
|-id=075 bgcolor=#E9E9E9
| 24075 ||  || — || October 14, 1999 || Socorro || LINEAR || — || align=right | 7.2 km || 
|-id=076 bgcolor=#d6d6d6
| 24076 ||  || — || October 2, 1999 || Socorro || LINEAR || — || align=right | 15 km || 
|-id=077 bgcolor=#fefefe
| 24077 ||  || — || October 3, 1999 || Socorro || LINEAR || H || align=right | 2.3 km || 
|-id=078 bgcolor=#fefefe
| 24078 ||  || — || October 4, 1999 || Catalina || CSS || — || align=right | 2.2 km || 
|-id=079 bgcolor=#E9E9E9
| 24079 ||  || — || October 8, 1999 || Catalina || CSS || — || align=right | 7.7 km || 
|-id=080 bgcolor=#d6d6d6
| 24080 ||  || — || October 8, 1999 || Catalina || CSS || MEL || align=right | 9.1 km || 
|-id=081 bgcolor=#fefefe
| 24081 ||  || — || October 8, 1999 || Catalina || CSS || FLO || align=right | 2.1 km || 
|-id=082 bgcolor=#E9E9E9
| 24082 ||  || — || October 8, 1999 || Catalina || CSS || — || align=right | 2.7 km || 
|-id=083 bgcolor=#fefefe
| 24083 ||  || — || October 9, 1999 || Socorro || LINEAR || — || align=right | 2.0 km || 
|-id=084 bgcolor=#fefefe
| 24084 Teresaswiger ||  ||  || October 10, 1999 || Socorro || LINEAR || — || align=right | 2.1 km || 
|-id=085 bgcolor=#fefefe
| 24085 ||  || — || October 10, 1999 || Socorro || LINEAR || V || align=right | 2.2 km || 
|-id=086 bgcolor=#d6d6d6
| 24086 || 1999 UT || — || October 16, 1999 || Višnjan Observatory || K. Korlević || CHA || align=right | 3.5 km || 
|-id=087 bgcolor=#fefefe
| 24087 Ciambetti ||  ||  || October 27, 1999 || Dossobuono || Madonna di Dossobuono Obs. || — || align=right | 2.3 km || 
|-id=088 bgcolor=#E9E9E9
| 24088 ||  || — || October 29, 1999 || Catalina || CSS || — || align=right | 4.2 km || 
|-id=089 bgcolor=#fefefe
| 24089 ||  || — || October 29, 1999 || Catalina || CSS || — || align=right | 2.5 km || 
|-id=090 bgcolor=#fefefe
| 24090 ||  || — || October 29, 1999 || Catalina || CSS || V || align=right | 2.1 km || 
|-id=091 bgcolor=#fefefe
| 24091 ||  || — || October 29, 1999 || Catalina || CSS || — || align=right | 2.7 km || 
|-id=092 bgcolor=#fefefe
| 24092 ||  || — || October 29, 1999 || Catalina || CSS || — || align=right | 3.9 km || 
|-id=093 bgcolor=#E9E9E9
| 24093 Tomoyamaguchi ||  ||  || October 29, 1999 || Anderson Mesa || LONEOS || — || align=right | 4.5 km || 
|-id=094 bgcolor=#fefefe
| 24094 ||  || — || October 31, 1999 || Socorro || LINEAR || PHO || align=right | 5.2 km || 
|-id=095 bgcolor=#d6d6d6
| 24095 || 1999 VN || — || November 2, 1999 || Zeno || T. Stafford || KOR || align=right | 4.5 km || 
|-id=096 bgcolor=#fefefe
| 24096 ||  || — || November 5, 1999 || High Point || D. K. Chesney || V || align=right | 3.3 km || 
|-id=097 bgcolor=#fefefe
| 24097 ||  || — || November 5, 1999 || Oizumi || T. Kobayashi || MAS || align=right | 2.5 km || 
|-id=098 bgcolor=#fefefe
| 24098 ||  || — || November 7, 1999 || Višnjan Observatory || K. Korlević || — || align=right | 5.5 km || 
|-id=099 bgcolor=#d6d6d6
| 24099 ||  || — || November 8, 1999 || Višnjan Observatory || K. Korlević || — || align=right | 12 km || 
|-id=100 bgcolor=#d6d6d6
| 24100 ||  || — || November 8, 1999 || Višnjan Observatory || K. Korlević || EOS || align=right | 8.5 km || 
|}

24101–24200 

|-bgcolor=#E9E9E9
| 24101 Cassini ||  ||  || November 9, 1999 || Fountain Hills || C. W. Juels || — || align=right | 7.1 km || 
|-id=102 bgcolor=#E9E9E9
| 24102 Jacquescassini ||  ||  || November 9, 1999 || Fountain Hills || C. W. Juels || EUN || align=right | 4.6 km || 
|-id=103 bgcolor=#E9E9E9
| 24103 Dethury ||  ||  || November 9, 1999 || Fountain Hills || C. W. Juels || — || align=right | 4.9 km || 
|-id=104 bgcolor=#fefefe
| 24104 Vinissac ||  ||  || November 9, 1999 || Fountain Hills || C. W. Juels || — || align=right | 4.2 km || 
|-id=105 bgcolor=#fefefe
| 24105 Broughton ||  ||  || November 9, 1999 || Fountain Hills || C. W. Juels || — || align=right | 4.6 km || 
|-id=106 bgcolor=#fefefe
| 24106 ||  || — || November 10, 1999 || Fountain Hills || C. W. Juels || moon || align=right | 3.1 km || 
|-id=107 bgcolor=#d6d6d6
| 24107 ||  || — || November 12, 1999 || Zeno || T. Stafford || slow || align=right | 16 km || 
|-id=108 bgcolor=#E9E9E9
| 24108 ||  || — || November 11, 1999 || Fountain Hills || C. W. Juels || — || align=right | 5.3 km || 
|-id=109 bgcolor=#E9E9E9
| 24109 ||  || — || November 11, 1999 || Fountain Hills || C. W. Juels || MAR || align=right | 6.0 km || 
|-id=110 bgcolor=#E9E9E9
| 24110 ||  || — || November 11, 1999 || Fountain Hills || C. W. Juels || — || align=right | 4.3 km || 
|-id=111 bgcolor=#E9E9E9
| 24111 ||  || — || November 13, 1999 || High Point || D. K. Chesney || — || align=right | 5.3 km || 
|-id=112 bgcolor=#E9E9E9
| 24112 ||  || — || November 14, 1999 || Fountain Hills || C. W. Juels || — || align=right | 5.4 km || 
|-id=113 bgcolor=#fefefe
| 24113 ||  || — || November 14, 1999 || Fountain Hills || C. W. Juels || — || align=right | 4.0 km || 
|-id=114 bgcolor=#fefefe
| 24114 ||  || — || November 14, 1999 || Fountain Hills || C. W. Juels || — || align=right | 5.0 km || 
|-id=115 bgcolor=#fefefe
| 24115 ||  || — || November 15, 1999 || Fountain Hills || C. W. Juels || V || align=right | 3.2 km || 
|-id=116 bgcolor=#fefefe
| 24116 ||  || — || November 15, 1999 || Fountain Hills || C. W. Juels || NYS || align=right | 2.4 km || 
|-id=117 bgcolor=#fefefe
| 24117 ||  || — || November 3, 1999 || Socorro || LINEAR || MAS || align=right | 2.1 km || 
|-id=118 bgcolor=#E9E9E9
| 24118 Babazadeh ||  ||  || November 3, 1999 || Socorro || LINEAR || — || align=right | 4.7 km || 
|-id=119 bgcolor=#fefefe
| 24119 Katherinrose ||  ||  || November 3, 1999 || Socorro || LINEAR || — || align=right | 1.8 km || 
|-id=120 bgcolor=#d6d6d6
| 24120 Jeremyblum ||  ||  || November 3, 1999 || Socorro || LINEAR || — || align=right | 8.3 km || 
|-id=121 bgcolor=#d6d6d6
| 24121 Achandran ||  ||  || November 3, 1999 || Socorro || LINEAR || KOR || align=right | 3.5 km || 
|-id=122 bgcolor=#d6d6d6
| 24122 ||  || — || November 3, 1999 || Socorro || LINEAR || — || align=right | 6.3 km || 
|-id=123 bgcolor=#E9E9E9
| 24123 Timothychang ||  ||  || November 3, 1999 || Socorro || LINEAR || — || align=right | 3.6 km || 
|-id=124 bgcolor=#d6d6d6
| 24124 Dozier ||  ||  || November 3, 1999 || Socorro || LINEAR || — || align=right | 6.5 km || 
|-id=125 bgcolor=#d6d6d6
| 24125 Sapphozoe ||  ||  || November 3, 1999 || Socorro || LINEAR || KOR || align=right | 3.1 km || 
|-id=126 bgcolor=#E9E9E9
| 24126 Gudjonson ||  ||  || November 3, 1999 || Socorro || LINEAR || — || align=right | 8.1 km || 
|-id=127 bgcolor=#d6d6d6
| 24127 ||  || — || November 3, 1999 || Socorro || LINEAR || ALA || align=right | 24 km || 
|-id=128 bgcolor=#fefefe
| 24128 Hipsman ||  ||  || November 4, 1999 || Socorro || LINEAR || NYS || align=right | 2.3 km || 
|-id=129 bgcolor=#fefefe
| 24129 Oliviahu ||  ||  || November 4, 1999 || Socorro || LINEAR || — || align=right | 2.7 km || 
|-id=130 bgcolor=#fefefe
| 24130 Alexhuang ||  ||  || November 4, 1999 || Socorro || LINEAR || — || align=right | 1.5 km || 
|-id=131 bgcolor=#fefefe
| 24131 Jonathuggins ||  ||  || November 4, 1999 || Socorro || LINEAR || NYS || align=right | 2.1 km || 
|-id=132 bgcolor=#fefefe
| 24132 ||  || — || November 4, 1999 || Socorro || LINEAR || — || align=right | 2.7 km || 
|-id=133 bgcolor=#d6d6d6
| 24133 Chunkaikao ||  ||  || November 4, 1999 || Socorro || LINEAR || — || align=right | 6.8 km || 
|-id=134 bgcolor=#fefefe
| 24134 Cliffordkim ||  ||  || November 4, 1999 || Socorro || LINEAR || — || align=right | 2.8 km || 
|-id=135 bgcolor=#E9E9E9
| 24135 Lisann ||  ||  || November 4, 1999 || Socorro || LINEAR || — || align=right | 4.6 km || 
|-id=136 bgcolor=#E9E9E9
| 24136 ||  || — || November 14, 1999 || Xinglong || SCAP || — || align=right | 2.9 km || 
|-id=137 bgcolor=#E9E9E9
| 24137 ||  || — || November 9, 1999 || Stroncone || A. Vagnozzi || — || align=right | 5.1 km || 
|-id=138 bgcolor=#fefefe
| 24138 Benjaminlu ||  ||  || November 4, 1999 || Socorro || LINEAR || Vfast? || align=right | 2.1 km || 
|-id=139 bgcolor=#fefefe
| 24139 Brianmcarthy ||  ||  || November 4, 1999 || Socorro || LINEAR || V || align=right | 1.5 km || 
|-id=140 bgcolor=#fefefe
| 24140 Evanmirts ||  ||  || November 5, 1999 || Socorro || LINEAR || — || align=right | 2.0 km || 
|-id=141 bgcolor=#fefefe
| 24141 ||  || — || November 4, 1999 || Catalina || CSS || NYS || align=right | 1.7 km || 
|-id=142 bgcolor=#fefefe
| 24142 ||  || — || November 9, 1999 || Catalina || CSS || — || align=right | 3.4 km || 
|-id=143 bgcolor=#FA8072
| 24143 ||  || — || November 10, 1999 || Socorro || LINEAR || — || align=right | 2.2 km || 
|-id=144 bgcolor=#d6d6d6
| 24144 Philipmocz ||  ||  || November 12, 1999 || Socorro || LINEAR || KOR || align=right | 3.5 km || 
|-id=145 bgcolor=#d6d6d6
| 24145 ||  || — || November 13, 1999 || Catalina || CSS || — || align=right | 9.3 km || 
|-id=146 bgcolor=#E9E9E9
| 24146 Benjamueller ||  ||  || November 14, 1999 || Socorro || LINEAR || — || align=right | 3.2 km || 
|-id=147 bgcolor=#fefefe
| 24147 Stefanmuller ||  ||  || November 14, 1999 || Socorro || LINEAR || V || align=right | 1.8 km || 
|-id=148 bgcolor=#fefefe
| 24148 Mychajliw ||  ||  || November 14, 1999 || Socorro || LINEAR || — || align=right | 3.2 km || 
|-id=149 bgcolor=#E9E9E9
| 24149 Raghavan ||  ||  || November 15, 1999 || Socorro || LINEAR || — || align=right | 2.8 km || 
|-id=150 bgcolor=#E9E9E9
| 24150 ||  || — || November 13, 1999 || Catalina || CSS || — || align=right | 2.9 km || 
|-id=151 bgcolor=#d6d6d6
| 24151 ||  || — || November 15, 1999 || Socorro || LINEAR || — || align=right | 5.1 km || 
|-id=152 bgcolor=#E9E9E9
| 24152 Ramasesh ||  ||  || November 15, 1999 || Socorro || LINEAR || — || align=right | 5.0 km || 
|-id=153 bgcolor=#E9E9E9
| 24153 Davidalex ||  ||  || November 15, 1999 || Socorro || LINEAR || — || align=right | 2.6 km || 
|-id=154 bgcolor=#fefefe
| 24154 Ayonsen ||  ||  || November 15, 1999 || Socorro || LINEAR || — || align=right | 2.6 km || 
|-id=155 bgcolor=#fefefe
| 24155 Serganov ||  ||  || November 15, 1999 || Socorro || LINEAR || — || align=right | 2.7 km || 
|-id=156 bgcolor=#fefefe
| 24156 Hamsasridhar ||  ||  || November 15, 1999 || Socorro || LINEAR || — || align=right | 3.4 km || 
|-id=157 bgcolor=#fefefe
| 24157 Toshiyanagisawa ||  ||  || November 1, 1999 || Anderson Mesa || LONEOS || — || align=right | 2.2 km || 
|-id=158 bgcolor=#fefefe
| 24158 Kokubo ||  ||  || November 1, 1999 || Anderson Mesa || LONEOS || — || align=right | 2.4 km || 
|-id=159 bgcolor=#E9E9E9
| 24159 Shigetakahashi ||  ||  || November 1, 1999 || Anderson Mesa || LONEOS || MRX || align=right | 2.5 km || 
|-id=160 bgcolor=#fefefe
| 24160 ||  || — || November 9, 1999 || Stroncone || Santa Lucia Obs. || — || align=right | 4.8 km || 
|-id=161 bgcolor=#E9E9E9
| 24161 ||  || — || November 5, 1999 || Socorro || LINEAR || — || align=right | 3.7 km || 
|-id=162 bgcolor=#E9E9E9
| 24162 Askaci || 1999 WD ||  || November 17, 1999 || Olathe || L. Robinson || AST || align=right | 6.5 km || 
|-id=163 bgcolor=#fefefe
| 24163 ||  || — || November 25, 1999 || Višnjan Observatory || K. Korlević || — || align=right | 3.1 km || 
|-id=164 bgcolor=#d6d6d6
| 24164 ||  || — || November 28, 1999 || Oizumi || T. Kobayashi || — || align=right | 6.4 km || 
|-id=165 bgcolor=#fefefe
| 24165 ||  || — || November 28, 1999 || Oizumi || T. Kobayashi || — || align=right | 2.6 km || 
|-id=166 bgcolor=#fefefe
| 24166 ||  || — || November 28, 1999 || Oizumi || T. Kobayashi || — || align=right | 4.5 km || 
|-id=167 bgcolor=#d6d6d6
| 24167 ||  || — || November 28, 1999 || Oizumi || T. Kobayashi || — || align=right | 9.5 km || 
|-id=168 bgcolor=#fefefe
| 24168 Hexlein ||  ||  || November 29, 1999 || Starkenburg Observatory || Starkenburg Obs. || — || align=right | 3.3 km || 
|-id=169 bgcolor=#fefefe
| 24169 ||  || — || November 29, 1999 || Oohira || T. Urata || — || align=right | 3.1 km || 
|-id=170 bgcolor=#fefefe
| 24170 ||  || — || November 29, 1999 || Bédoin || P. Antonini || V || align=right | 2.2 km || 
|-id=171 bgcolor=#E9E9E9
| 24171 ||  || — || December 2, 1999 || Oizumi || T. Kobayashi || — || align=right | 4.6 km || 
|-id=172 bgcolor=#fefefe
| 24172 ||  || — || December 2, 1999 || Oizumi || T. Kobayashi || V || align=right | 3.1 km || 
|-id=173 bgcolor=#E9E9E9
| 24173 SLAS ||  ||  || December 3, 1999 || Oaxaca || J. M. Roe || GEF || align=right | 4.0 km || 
|-id=174 bgcolor=#d6d6d6
| 24174 ||  || — || December 4, 1999 || Catalina || CSS || — || align=right | 6.1 km || 
|-id=175 bgcolor=#fefefe
| 24175 ||  || — || December 4, 1999 || Catalina || CSS || — || align=right | 3.5 km || 
|-id=176 bgcolor=#fefefe
| 24176 ||  || — || December 4, 1999 || Catalina || CSS || — || align=right | 3.2 km || 
|-id=177 bgcolor=#fefefe
| 24177 ||  || — || December 4, 1999 || Fountain Hills || C. W. Juels || V || align=right | 3.5 km || 
|-id=178 bgcolor=#d6d6d6
| 24178 ||  || — || December 4, 1999 || Fountain Hills || C. W. Juels || URS || align=right | 16 km || 
|-id=179 bgcolor=#E9E9E9
| 24179 ||  || — || December 4, 1999 || Fountain Hills || C. W. Juels || INO || align=right | 6.3 km || 
|-id=180 bgcolor=#E9E9E9
| 24180 ||  || — || December 3, 1999 || Oizumi || T. Kobayashi || — || align=right | 6.3 km || 
|-id=181 bgcolor=#E9E9E9
| 24181 ||  || — || December 2, 1999 || Kvistaberg || UDAS || — || align=right | 6.0 km || 
|-id=182 bgcolor=#E9E9E9
| 24182 ||  || — || December 5, 1999 || Catalina || CSS || — || align=right | 7.3 km || 
|-id=183 bgcolor=#fefefe
| 24183 ||  || — || December 6, 1999 || Catalina || CSS || — || align=right | 3.0 km || 
|-id=184 bgcolor=#E9E9E9
| 24184 ||  || — || December 5, 1999 || Socorro || LINEAR || — || align=right | 5.9 km || 
|-id=185 bgcolor=#E9E9E9
| 24185 ||  || — || December 3, 1999 || Nachi-Katsuura || Y. Shimizu, T. Urata || PAD || align=right | 8.5 km || 
|-id=186 bgcolor=#fefefe
| 24186 Shivanisud ||  ||  || December 3, 1999 || Socorro || LINEAR || — || align=right | 3.1 km || 
|-id=187 bgcolor=#fefefe
| 24187 ||  || — || December 3, 1999 || Socorro || LINEAR || NYS || align=right | 2.7 km || 
|-id=188 bgcolor=#fefefe
| 24188 Matthewage ||  ||  || December 6, 1999 || Socorro || LINEAR || V || align=right | 3.8 km || 
|-id=189 bgcolor=#fefefe
| 24189 Lewasserman ||  ||  || December 6, 1999 || Socorro || LINEAR || FLO || align=right | 2.9 km || 
|-id=190 bgcolor=#E9E9E9
| 24190 Xiaoyunyin ||  ||  || December 6, 1999 || Socorro || LINEAR || — || align=right | 3.4 km || 
|-id=191 bgcolor=#E9E9E9
| 24191 Qiaochuyuan ||  ||  || December 6, 1999 || Socorro || LINEAR || PAD || align=right | 6.1 km || 
|-id=192 bgcolor=#E9E9E9
| 24192 ||  || — || December 6, 1999 || Socorro || LINEAR || DOR || align=right | 12 km || 
|-id=193 bgcolor=#E9E9E9
| 24193 ||  || — || December 6, 1999 || Socorro || LINEAR || — || align=right | 9.7 km || 
|-id=194 bgcolor=#d6d6d6
| 24194 Paľuš ||  ||  || December 8, 1999 || Modra || A. Galád, D. Kalmančok || HYG || align=right | 9.1 km || 
|-id=195 bgcolor=#E9E9E9
| 24195 ||  || — || December 6, 1999 || Gekko || T. Kagawa || EUN || align=right | 5.7 km || 
|-id=196 bgcolor=#E9E9E9
| 24196 ||  || — || December 7, 1999 || Fountain Hills || C. W. Juels || — || align=right | 4.8 km || 
|-id=197 bgcolor=#E9E9E9
| 24197 ||  || — || December 7, 1999 || Črni Vrh || Črni Vrh || GEF || align=right | 4.0 km || 
|-id=198 bgcolor=#E9E9E9
| 24198 Xiaomengzeng ||  ||  || December 6, 1999 || Socorro || LINEAR || — || align=right | 6.5 km || 
|-id=199 bgcolor=#d6d6d6
| 24199 Tsarevsky ||  ||  || December 6, 1999 || Socorro || LINEAR || HYG || align=right | 7.8 km || 
|-id=200 bgcolor=#fefefe
| 24200 Peterbrooks ||  ||  || December 6, 1999 || Socorro || LINEAR || V || align=right | 3.2 km || 
|}

24201–24300 

|-bgcolor=#fefefe
| 24201 Davidkeith ||  ||  || December 7, 1999 || Socorro || LINEAR || V || align=right | 2.0 km || 
|-id=202 bgcolor=#fefefe
| 24202 ||  || — || December 7, 1999 || Socorro || LINEAR || — || align=right | 2.2 km || 
|-id=203 bgcolor=#fefefe
| 24203 ||  || — || December 7, 1999 || Socorro || LINEAR || — || align=right | 2.6 km || 
|-id=204 bgcolor=#d6d6d6
| 24204 Trinkle ||  ||  || December 7, 1999 || Socorro || LINEAR || KOR || align=right | 4.3 km || 
|-id=205 bgcolor=#fefefe
| 24205 ||  || — || December 7, 1999 || Socorro || LINEAR || — || align=right | 2.4 km || 
|-id=206 bgcolor=#fefefe
| 24206 Mariealoia ||  ||  || December 7, 1999 || Socorro || LINEAR || NYS || align=right | 2.2 km || 
|-id=207 bgcolor=#fefefe
| 24207 ||  || — || December 7, 1999 || Socorro || LINEAR || — || align=right | 3.6 km || 
|-id=208 bgcolor=#E9E9E9
| 24208 Stelguerrero ||  ||  || December 7, 1999 || Socorro || LINEAR || — || align=right | 4.0 km || 
|-id=209 bgcolor=#fefefe
| 24209 ||  || — || December 7, 1999 || Socorro || LINEAR || — || align=right | 2.1 km || 
|-id=210 bgcolor=#E9E9E9
| 24210 Handsberry ||  ||  || December 7, 1999 || Socorro || LINEAR || — || align=right | 9.0 km || 
|-id=211 bgcolor=#fefefe
| 24211 Barbarawood ||  ||  || December 7, 1999 || Socorro || LINEAR || — || align=right | 2.4 km || 
|-id=212 bgcolor=#C2FFFF
| 24212 ||  || — || December 7, 1999 || Socorro || LINEAR || L4 || align=right | 21 km || 
|-id=213 bgcolor=#E9E9E9
| 24213 ||  || — || December 7, 1999 || Socorro || LINEAR || — || align=right | 4.8 km || 
|-id=214 bgcolor=#d6d6d6
| 24214 Jonchristo ||  ||  || December 7, 1999 || Socorro || LINEAR || — || align=right | 6.0 km || 
|-id=215 bgcolor=#fefefe
| 24215 Jongastel ||  ||  || December 7, 1999 || Socorro || LINEAR || — || align=right | 2.9 km || 
|-id=216 bgcolor=#E9E9E9
| 24216 ||  || — || December 7, 1999 || Socorro || LINEAR || PAD || align=right | 7.0 km || 
|-id=217 bgcolor=#E9E9E9
| 24217 Paulroeder ||  ||  || December 7, 1999 || Socorro || LINEAR || — || align=right | 4.0 km || 
|-id=218 bgcolor=#fefefe
| 24218 Linfrederick ||  ||  || December 7, 1999 || Socorro || LINEAR || — || align=right | 2.6 km || 
|-id=219 bgcolor=#fefefe
| 24219 Chrisodom ||  ||  || December 7, 1999 || Socorro || LINEAR || — || align=right | 3.2 km || 
|-id=220 bgcolor=#fefefe
| 24220 ||  || — || December 7, 1999 || Socorro || LINEAR || MAS || align=right | 2.6 km || 
|-id=221 bgcolor=#d6d6d6
| 24221 ||  || — || December 7, 1999 || Socorro || LINEAR || THM || align=right | 6.8 km || 
|-id=222 bgcolor=#E9E9E9
| 24222 ||  || — || December 7, 1999 || Socorro || LINEAR || — || align=right | 4.4 km || 
|-id=223 bgcolor=#E9E9E9
| 24223 ||  || — || December 7, 1999 || Socorro || LINEAR || — || align=right | 3.5 km || 
|-id=224 bgcolor=#d6d6d6
| 24224 Matthewdavis ||  ||  || December 7, 1999 || Socorro || LINEAR || EOS || align=right | 6.6 km || 
|-id=225 bgcolor=#C2FFFF
| 24225 ||  || — || December 7, 1999 || Socorro || LINEAR || L4 || align=right | 15 km || 
|-id=226 bgcolor=#d6d6d6
| 24226 Sekhsaria ||  ||  || December 7, 1999 || Socorro || LINEAR || — || align=right | 5.8 km || 
|-id=227 bgcolor=#d6d6d6
| 24227 ||  || — || December 7, 1999 || Socorro || LINEAR || — || align=right | 6.0 km || 
|-id=228 bgcolor=#d6d6d6
| 24228 ||  || — || December 7, 1999 || Socorro || LINEAR || — || align=right | 7.8 km || 
|-id=229 bgcolor=#d6d6d6
| 24229 ||  || — || December 7, 1999 || Socorro || LINEAR || — || align=right | 13 km || 
|-id=230 bgcolor=#E9E9E9
| 24230 ||  || — || December 7, 1999 || Socorro || LINEAR || — || align=right | 8.9 km || 
|-id=231 bgcolor=#d6d6d6
| 24231 ||  || — || December 7, 1999 || Socorro || LINEAR || — || align=right | 8.7 km || 
|-id=232 bgcolor=#E9E9E9
| 24232 Lanthrum ||  ||  || December 7, 1999 || Socorro || LINEAR || — || align=right | 8.6 km || 
|-id=233 bgcolor=#C2FFFF
| 24233 ||  || — || December 7, 1999 || Socorro || LINEAR || L4 || align=right | 23 km || 
|-id=234 bgcolor=#fefefe
| 24234 ||  || — || December 8, 1999 || Socorro || LINEAR || — || align=right | 4.0 km || 
|-id=235 bgcolor=#fefefe
| 24235 ||  || — || December 7, 1999 || Oizumi || T. Kobayashi || V || align=right | 3.5 km || 
|-id=236 bgcolor=#E9E9E9
| 24236 Danielberger ||  ||  || December 7, 1999 || Socorro || LINEAR || PAD || align=right | 8.9 km || 
|-id=237 bgcolor=#d6d6d6
| 24237 ||  || — || December 7, 1999 || Socorro || LINEAR || — || align=right | 13 km || 
|-id=238 bgcolor=#fefefe
| 24238 Adkerson ||  ||  || December 7, 1999 || Socorro || LINEAR || V || align=right | 3.0 km || 
|-id=239 bgcolor=#fefefe
| 24239 Paulinehiga ||  ||  || December 7, 1999 || Socorro || LINEAR || — || align=right | 2.3 km || 
|-id=240 bgcolor=#E9E9E9
| 24240 Tinagal ||  ||  || December 7, 1999 || Socorro || LINEAR || — || align=right | 2.8 km || 
|-id=241 bgcolor=#E9E9E9
| 24241 ||  || — || December 7, 1999 || Socorro || LINEAR || — || align=right | 6.4 km || 
|-id=242 bgcolor=#FA8072
| 24242 ||  || — || December 7, 1999 || Socorro || LINEAR || — || align=right | 2.9 km || 
|-id=243 bgcolor=#d6d6d6
| 24243 ||  || — || December 7, 1999 || Socorro || LINEAR || EOS || align=right | 7.7 km || 
|-id=244 bgcolor=#C2FFFF
| 24244 ||  || — || December 7, 1999 || Socorro || LINEAR || L4 || align=right | 35 km || 
|-id=245 bgcolor=#fefefe
| 24245 Ezratty ||  ||  || December 7, 1999 || Socorro || LINEAR || FLO || align=right | 4.1 km || 
|-id=246 bgcolor=#d6d6d6
| 24246 ||  || — || December 7, 1999 || Socorro || LINEAR || EOS || align=right | 4.8 km || 
|-id=247 bgcolor=#d6d6d6
| 24247 ||  || — || December 9, 1999 || Fountain Hills || C. W. Juels || EOS || align=right | 5.4 km || 
|-id=248 bgcolor=#E9E9E9
| 24248 ||  || — || December 11, 1999 || Oizumi || T. Kobayashi || DOR || align=right | 9.0 km || 
|-id=249 bgcolor=#fefefe
| 24249 Bobbiolson ||  ||  || December 4, 1999 || Catalina || CSS || NYS || align=right | 3.2 km || 
|-id=250 bgcolor=#fefefe
| 24250 Luteolson ||  ||  || December 4, 1999 || Catalina || CSS || — || align=right | 3.9 km || 
|-id=251 bgcolor=#fefefe
| 24251 ||  || — || December 5, 1999 || Catalina || CSS || — || align=right | 3.4 km || 
|-id=252 bgcolor=#fefefe
| 24252 ||  || — || December 5, 1999 || Catalina || CSS || — || align=right | 4.0 km || 
|-id=253 bgcolor=#fefefe
| 24253 ||  || — || December 5, 1999 || Catalina || CSS || — || align=right | 3.3 km || 
|-id=254 bgcolor=#E9E9E9
| 24254 ||  || — || December 7, 1999 || Catalina || CSS || MAR || align=right | 6.4 km || 
|-id=255 bgcolor=#fefefe
| 24255 ||  || — || December 7, 1999 || Catalina || CSS || V || align=right | 2.6 km || 
|-id=256 bgcolor=#fefefe
| 24256 ||  || — || December 7, 1999 || Catalina || CSS || — || align=right | 5.9 km || 
|-id=257 bgcolor=#fefefe
| 24257 ||  || — || December 7, 1999 || Catalina || CSS || FLO || align=right | 2.9 km || 
|-id=258 bgcolor=#E9E9E9
| 24258 ||  || — || December 9, 1999 || Fountain Hills || C. W. Juels || — || align=right | 3.4 km || 
|-id=259 bgcolor=#fefefe
| 24259 Chriswalker ||  ||  || December 12, 1999 || Goodricke-Pigott || R. A. Tucker || PHO || align=right | 3.3 km || 
|-id=260 bgcolor=#E9E9E9
| 24260 Kriváň ||  ||  || December 13, 1999 || Ondřejov || P. Kušnirák || EUN || align=right | 8.3 km || 
|-id=261 bgcolor=#fefefe
| 24261 Judilegault ||  ||  || December 12, 1999 || Socorro || LINEAR || V || align=right | 2.9 km || 
|-id=262 bgcolor=#E9E9E9
| 24262 ||  || — || December 12, 1999 || Socorro || LINEAR || — || align=right | 5.1 km || 
|-id=263 bgcolor=#d6d6d6
| 24263 ||  || — || December 12, 1999 || Socorro || LINEAR || EOS || align=right | 8.3 km || 
|-id=264 bgcolor=#E9E9E9
| 24264 ||  || — || December 15, 1999 || Fountain Hills || C. W. Juels || GEF || align=right | 3.8 km || 
|-id=265 bgcolor=#fefefe
| 24265 Banthonytwarog ||  ||  || December 13, 1999 || Farpoint || G. Hug, G. Bell || — || align=right | 3.2 km || 
|-id=266 bgcolor=#E9E9E9
| 24266 ||  || — || December 13, 1999 || Višnjan Observatory || K. Korlević || — || align=right | 3.5 km || 
|-id=267 bgcolor=#fefefe
| 24267 ||  || — || December 6, 1999 || Kitt Peak || Spacewatch || — || align=right | 1.6 km || 
|-id=268 bgcolor=#E9E9E9
| 24268 Charconley ||  ||  || December 8, 1999 || Socorro || LINEAR || HOF || align=right | 7.8 km || 
|-id=269 bgcolor=#fefefe
| 24269 Kittappa ||  ||  || December 8, 1999 || Socorro || LINEAR || — || align=right | 3.3 km || 
|-id=270 bgcolor=#E9E9E9
| 24270 Dougskinner ||  ||  || December 8, 1999 || Socorro || LINEAR || — || align=right | 6.0 km || 
|-id=271 bgcolor=#E9E9E9
| 24271 ||  || — || December 8, 1999 || Socorro || LINEAR || NEM || align=right | 7.8 km || 
|-id=272 bgcolor=#fefefe
| 24272 ||  || — || December 8, 1999 || Socorro || LINEAR || — || align=right | 5.5 km || 
|-id=273 bgcolor=#fefefe
| 24273 ||  || — || December 10, 1999 || Socorro || LINEAR || FLO || align=right | 2.6 km || 
|-id=274 bgcolor=#E9E9E9
| 24274 Alliswheeler ||  ||  || December 10, 1999 || Socorro || LINEAR || — || align=right | 3.1 km || 
|-id=275 bgcolor=#C2FFFF
| 24275 ||  || — || December 10, 1999 || Socorro || LINEAR || L4 || align=right | 28 km || 
|-id=276 bgcolor=#E9E9E9
| 24276 ||  || — || December 10, 1999 || Socorro || LINEAR || — || align=right | 11 km || 
|-id=277 bgcolor=#fefefe
| 24277 Schoch ||  ||  || December 10, 1999 || Socorro || LINEAR || FLO || align=right | 3.7 km || 
|-id=278 bgcolor=#E9E9E9
| 24278 Davidgreen ||  ||  || December 10, 1999 || Socorro || LINEAR || — || align=right | 3.9 km || 
|-id=279 bgcolor=#C2FFFF
| 24279 ||  || — || December 10, 1999 || Socorro || LINEAR || L4 || align=right | 20 km || 
|-id=280 bgcolor=#fefefe
| 24280 Rohenderson ||  ||  || December 10, 1999 || Socorro || LINEAR || — || align=right | 4.6 km || 
|-id=281 bgcolor=#d6d6d6
| 24281 ||  || — || December 10, 1999 || Socorro || LINEAR || EOS || align=right | 7.0 km || 
|-id=282 bgcolor=#d6d6d6
| 24282 ||  || — || December 10, 1999 || Socorro || LINEAR || — || align=right | 19 km || 
|-id=283 bgcolor=#d6d6d6
| 24283 ||  || — || December 10, 1999 || Socorro || LINEAR || EOS || align=right | 6.6 km || 
|-id=284 bgcolor=#E9E9E9
| 24284 ||  || — || December 12, 1999 || Socorro || LINEAR || — || align=right | 8.1 km || 
|-id=285 bgcolor=#E9E9E9
| 24285 ||  || — || December 12, 1999 || Socorro || LINEAR || — || align=right | 4.3 km || 
|-id=286 bgcolor=#fefefe
| 24286 ||  || — || December 12, 1999 || Socorro || LINEAR || — || align=right | 2.9 km || 
|-id=287 bgcolor=#d6d6d6
| 24287 ||  || — || December 12, 1999 || Socorro || LINEAR || EOS || align=right | 5.1 km || 
|-id=288 bgcolor=#fefefe
| 24288 ||  || — || December 12, 1999 || Socorro || LINEAR || FLO || align=right | 2.3 km || 
|-id=289 bgcolor=#fefefe
| 24289 Anthonypalma ||  ||  || December 12, 1999 || Socorro || LINEAR || — || align=right | 3.4 km || 
|-id=290 bgcolor=#E9E9E9
| 24290 ||  || — || December 12, 1999 || Socorro || LINEAR || — || align=right | 8.5 km || 
|-id=291 bgcolor=#d6d6d6
| 24291 ||  || — || December 12, 1999 || Socorro || LINEAR || URS || align=right | 13 km || 
|-id=292 bgcolor=#d6d6d6
| 24292 Susanragan ||  ||  || December 12, 1999 || Socorro || LINEAR || — || align=right | 7.0 km || 
|-id=293 bgcolor=#fefefe
| 24293 ||  || — || December 12, 1999 || Socorro || LINEAR || FLO || align=right | 2.3 km || 
|-id=294 bgcolor=#fefefe
| 24294 ||  || — || December 12, 1999 || Socorro || LINEAR || — || align=right | 3.4 km || 
|-id=295 bgcolor=#E9E9E9
| 24295 ||  || — || December 12, 1999 || Socorro || LINEAR || GEF || align=right | 4.9 km || 
|-id=296 bgcolor=#E9E9E9
| 24296 Marychristie ||  ||  || December 14, 1999 || Socorro || LINEAR || — || align=right | 3.1 km || 
|-id=297 bgcolor=#E9E9E9
| 24297 Jonbach ||  ||  || December 14, 1999 || Socorro || LINEAR || WIT || align=right | 3.3 km || 
|-id=298 bgcolor=#E9E9E9
| 24298 ||  || — || December 14, 1999 || Socorro || LINEAR || EUN || align=right | 7.8 km || 
|-id=299 bgcolor=#d6d6d6
| 24299 ||  || — || December 14, 1999 || Socorro || LINEAR || EOS || align=right | 9.3 km || 
|-id=300 bgcolor=#fefefe
| 24300 ||  || — || December 13, 1999 || Kitt Peak || Spacewatch || NYS || align=right | 2.3 km || 
|}

24301–24400 

|-bgcolor=#E9E9E9
| 24301 Gural ||  ||  || December 4, 1999 || Anderson Mesa || LONEOS || — || align=right | 4.3 km || 
|-id=302 bgcolor=#E9E9E9
| 24302 ||  || — || December 13, 1999 || Socorro || LINEAR || — || align=right | 5.3 km || 
|-id=303 bgcolor=#fefefe
| 24303 Michaelrice || 1999 YY ||  || December 16, 1999 || Fountain Hills || C. W. Juels || FLO || align=right | 3.0 km || 
|-id=304 bgcolor=#fefefe
| 24304 Lynnrice || 1999 YZ ||  || December 16, 1999 || Fountain Hills || C. W. Juels || V || align=right | 2.2 km || 
|-id=305 bgcolor=#d6d6d6
| 24305 Darrellparnell ||  ||  || December 26, 1999 || Farpoint || G. Hug, G. Bell || — || align=right | 4.4 km || 
|-id=306 bgcolor=#E9E9E9
| 24306 ||  || — || December 27, 1999 || Moriyama || Y. Ikari || — || align=right | 6.8 km || 
|-id=307 bgcolor=#d6d6d6
| 24307 ||  || — || December 30, 1999 || Socorro || LINEAR || — || align=right | 12 km || 
|-id=308 bgcolor=#d6d6d6
| 24308 Cowenco ||  ||  || December 29, 1999 || Farpoint || G. Hug, G. Bell || KOR || align=right | 4.5 km || 
|-id=309 bgcolor=#E9E9E9
| 24309 ||  || — || December 31, 1999 || Višnjan Observatory || K. Korlević || — || align=right | 4.6 km || 
|-id=310 bgcolor=#E9E9E9
| 24310 ||  || — || December 31, 1999 || Oizumi || T. Kobayashi || — || align=right | 5.1 km || 
|-id=311 bgcolor=#E9E9E9
| 24311 ||  || — || December 31, 1999 || Kitt Peak || Spacewatch || — || align=right | 6.6 km || 
|-id=312 bgcolor=#C2FFFF
| 24312 ||  || — || December 31, 1999 || Anderson Mesa || LONEOS || L4 || align=right | 26 km || 
|-id=313 bgcolor=#C2FFFF
| 24313 ||  || — || December 30, 1999 || Socorro || LINEAR || L4 || align=right | 35 km || 
|-id=314 bgcolor=#d6d6d6
| 24314 ||  || — || January 3, 2000 || Oizumi || T. Kobayashi || — || align=right | 10 km || 
|-id=315 bgcolor=#d6d6d6
| 24315 ||  || — || January 4, 2000 || Oaxaca || J. M. Roe || THM || align=right | 9.6 km || 
|-id=316 bgcolor=#E9E9E9
| 24316 Anncooper ||  ||  || January 3, 2000 || Socorro || LINEAR || — || align=right | 3.2 km || 
|-id=317 bgcolor=#fefefe
| 24317 Pukarhamal ||  ||  || January 3, 2000 || Socorro || LINEAR || FLO || align=right | 2.2 km || 
|-id=318 bgcolor=#fefefe
| 24318 Vivianlee ||  ||  || January 3, 2000 || Socorro || LINEAR || NYS || align=right | 3.2 km || 
|-id=319 bgcolor=#fefefe
| 24319 ||  || — || January 3, 2000 || Socorro || LINEAR || — || align=right | 3.5 km || 
|-id=320 bgcolor=#d6d6d6
| 24320 ||  || — || January 3, 2000 || Socorro || LINEAR || EOS || align=right | 5.5 km || 
|-id=321 bgcolor=#d6d6d6
| 24321 ||  || — || January 3, 2000 || Socorro || LINEAR || — || align=right | 10 km || 
|-id=322 bgcolor=#fefefe
| 24322 ||  || — || January 4, 2000 || Črni Vrh || Črni Vrh || SUL || align=right | 6.7 km || 
|-id=323 bgcolor=#d6d6d6
| 24323 ||  || — || January 5, 2000 || Ondřejov || P. Pravec, P. Kušnirák || KOR || align=right | 3.5 km || 
|-id=324 bgcolor=#d6d6d6
| 24324 ||  || — || January 4, 2000 || Socorro || LINEAR || — || align=right | 16 km || 
|-id=325 bgcolor=#fefefe
| 24325 Kaleighanne ||  ||  || January 4, 2000 || Socorro || LINEAR || V || align=right | 2.5 km || 
|-id=326 bgcolor=#d6d6d6
| 24326 ||  || — || January 4, 2000 || Socorro || LINEAR || — || align=right | 9.1 km || 
|-id=327 bgcolor=#d6d6d6
| 24327 ||  || — || January 4, 2000 || Socorro || LINEAR || EOS || align=right | 8.9 km || 
|-id=328 bgcolor=#fefefe
| 24328 Thomasburr ||  ||  || January 4, 2000 || Socorro || LINEAR || — || align=right | 3.4 km || 
|-id=329 bgcolor=#d6d6d6
| 24329 ||  || — || January 4, 2000 || Socorro || LINEAR || — || align=right | 6.0 km || 
|-id=330 bgcolor=#d6d6d6
| 24330 ||  || — || January 4, 2000 || Socorro || LINEAR || — || align=right | 5.8 km || 
|-id=331 bgcolor=#fefefe
| 24331 Alyshaowen ||  ||  || January 5, 2000 || Socorro || LINEAR || V || align=right | 3.2 km || 
|-id=332 bgcolor=#fefefe
| 24332 Shaunalinn ||  ||  || January 5, 2000 || Socorro || LINEAR || NYS || align=right | 2.2 km || 
|-id=333 bgcolor=#E9E9E9
| 24333 Petermassey ||  ||  || January 5, 2000 || Socorro || LINEAR || — || align=right | 3.3 km || 
|-id=334 bgcolor=#E9E9E9
| 24334 Conard ||  ||  || January 5, 2000 || Socorro || LINEAR || — || align=right | 5.3 km || 
|-id=335 bgcolor=#E9E9E9
| 24335 ||  || — || January 5, 2000 || Socorro || LINEAR || — || align=right | 4.6 km || 
|-id=336 bgcolor=#fefefe
| 24336 ||  || — || January 5, 2000 || Socorro || LINEAR || — || align=right | 5.8 km || 
|-id=337 bgcolor=#fefefe
| 24337 Johannessen ||  ||  || January 5, 2000 || Socorro || LINEAR || V || align=right | 2.5 km || 
|-id=338 bgcolor=#d6d6d6
| 24338 ||  || — || January 5, 2000 || Socorro || LINEAR || HYG || align=right | 7.5 km || 
|-id=339 bgcolor=#fefefe
| 24339 ||  || — || January 5, 2000 || Socorro || LINEAR || — || align=right | 3.6 km || 
|-id=340 bgcolor=#C2FFFF
| 24340 ||  || — || January 5, 2000 || Socorro || LINEAR || L4 || align=right | 19 km || 
|-id=341 bgcolor=#C2FFFF
| 24341 ||  || — || January 5, 2000 || Socorro || LINEAR || L4 || align=right | 16 km || 
|-id=342 bgcolor=#d6d6d6
| 24342 ||  || — || January 5, 2000 || Socorro || LINEAR || EOS || align=right | 7.2 km || 
|-id=343 bgcolor=#d6d6d6
| 24343 ||  || — || January 5, 2000 || Socorro || LINEAR || EOS || align=right | 6.7 km || 
|-id=344 bgcolor=#fefefe
| 24344 Brianbarnett ||  ||  || January 5, 2000 || Socorro || LINEAR || — || align=right | 2.4 km || 
|-id=345 bgcolor=#E9E9E9
| 24345 Llaverias ||  ||  || January 5, 2000 || Socorro || LINEAR || — || align=right | 3.7 km || 
|-id=346 bgcolor=#d6d6d6
| 24346 Lehienphan ||  ||  || January 5, 2000 || Socorro || LINEAR || HYG || align=right | 6.6 km || 
|-id=347 bgcolor=#fefefe
| 24347 Arthurkuan ||  ||  || January 5, 2000 || Socorro || LINEAR || — || align=right | 3.0 km || 
|-id=348 bgcolor=#fefefe
| 24348 ||  || — || January 5, 2000 || Socorro || LINEAR || FLO || align=right | 2.6 km || 
|-id=349 bgcolor=#fefefe
| 24349 ||  || — || January 5, 2000 || Socorro || LINEAR || — || align=right | 1.7 km || 
|-id=350 bgcolor=#d6d6d6
| 24350 ||  || — || January 5, 2000 || Socorro || LINEAR || EOS || align=right | 7.9 km || 
|-id=351 bgcolor=#fefefe
| 24351 Fionawood ||  ||  || January 5, 2000 || Socorro || LINEAR || V || align=right | 2.3 km || 
|-id=352 bgcolor=#fefefe
| 24352 Kapilrama ||  ||  || January 5, 2000 || Socorro || LINEAR || V || align=right | 2.4 km || 
|-id=353 bgcolor=#d6d6d6
| 24353 Patrickhsu ||  ||  || January 5, 2000 || Socorro || LINEAR || EOS || align=right | 5.0 km || 
|-id=354 bgcolor=#d6d6d6
| 24354 Caz ||  ||  || January 5, 2000 || Socorro || LINEAR || — || align=right | 4.7 km || 
|-id=355 bgcolor=#d6d6d6
| 24355 ||  || — || January 5, 2000 || Socorro || LINEAR || — || align=right | 12 km || 
|-id=356 bgcolor=#E9E9E9
| 24356 ||  || — || January 5, 2000 || Socorro || LINEAR || ADE || align=right | 5.0 km || 
|-id=357 bgcolor=#C2FFFF
| 24357 ||  || — || January 5, 2000 || Socorro || LINEAR || L4slow || align=right | 22 km || 
|-id=358 bgcolor=#d6d6d6
| 24358 ||  || — || January 5, 2000 || Socorro || LINEAR || HYG || align=right | 10 km || 
|-id=359 bgcolor=#E9E9E9
| 24359 ||  || — || January 5, 2000 || Socorro || LINEAR || MAR || align=right | 5.4 km || 
|-id=360 bgcolor=#d6d6d6
| 24360 ||  || — || January 5, 2000 || Socorro || LINEAR || — || align=right | 9.9 km || 
|-id=361 bgcolor=#d6d6d6
| 24361 ||  || — || January 5, 2000 || Socorro || LINEAR || 7:4 || align=right | 12 km || 
|-id=362 bgcolor=#d6d6d6
| 24362 ||  || — || January 5, 2000 || Socorro || LINEAR || — || align=right | 17 km || 
|-id=363 bgcolor=#d6d6d6
| 24363 ||  || — || January 5, 2000 || Socorro || LINEAR || — || align=right | 9.8 km || 
|-id=364 bgcolor=#E9E9E9
| 24364 ||  || — || January 5, 2000 || Socorro || LINEAR || — || align=right | 4.3 km || 
|-id=365 bgcolor=#E9E9E9
| 24365 ||  || — || January 5, 2000 || Socorro || LINEAR || — || align=right | 4.9 km || 
|-id=366 bgcolor=#d6d6d6
| 24366 ||  || — || January 5, 2000 || Socorro || LINEAR || EOS || align=right | 7.3 km || 
|-id=367 bgcolor=#fefefe
| 24367 ||  || — || January 5, 2000 || Socorro || LINEAR || — || align=right | 6.2 km || 
|-id=368 bgcolor=#E9E9E9
| 24368 ||  || — || January 5, 2000 || Socorro || LINEAR || — || align=right | 5.5 km || 
|-id=369 bgcolor=#d6d6d6
| 24369 Evanichols ||  ||  || January 3, 2000 || Socorro || LINEAR || — || align=right | 7.3 km || 
|-id=370 bgcolor=#fefefe
| 24370 Marywang ||  ||  || January 5, 2000 || Socorro || LINEAR || V || align=right | 2.2 km || 
|-id=371 bgcolor=#fefefe
| 24371 ||  || — || January 5, 2000 || Socorro || LINEAR || — || align=right | 2.7 km || 
|-id=372 bgcolor=#fefefe
| 24372 Timobauman ||  ||  || January 5, 2000 || Socorro || LINEAR || V || align=right | 1.7 km || 
|-id=373 bgcolor=#E9E9E9
| 24373 ||  || — || January 5, 2000 || Socorro || LINEAR || — || align=right | 4.6 km || 
|-id=374 bgcolor=#d6d6d6
| 24374 ||  || — || January 5, 2000 || Socorro || LINEAR || EOS || align=right | 8.2 km || 
|-id=375 bgcolor=#E9E9E9
| 24375 ||  || — || January 5, 2000 || Socorro || LINEAR || — || align=right | 5.8 km || 
|-id=376 bgcolor=#fefefe
| 24376 Ramesh ||  ||  || January 8, 2000 || Socorro || LINEAR || — || align=right | 2.9 km || 
|-id=377 bgcolor=#E9E9E9
| 24377 ||  || — || January 2, 2000 || Socorro || LINEAR || — || align=right | 4.9 km || 
|-id=378 bgcolor=#d6d6d6
| 24378 Katelyngibbs ||  ||  || January 3, 2000 || Socorro || LINEAR || KOR || align=right | 4.0 km || 
|-id=379 bgcolor=#d6d6d6
| 24379 ||  || — || January 3, 2000 || Socorro || LINEAR || EOS || align=right | 6.0 km || 
|-id=380 bgcolor=#C2FFFF
| 24380 Dorippe ||  ||  || January 3, 2000 || Socorro || LINEAR || L4ERY || align=right | 32 km || 
|-id=381 bgcolor=#d6d6d6
| 24381 ||  || — || January 8, 2000 || Socorro || LINEAR || — || align=right | 14 km || 
|-id=382 bgcolor=#fefefe
| 24382 ||  || — || January 7, 2000 || Socorro || LINEAR || — || align=right | 4.5 km || 
|-id=383 bgcolor=#E9E9E9
| 24383 ||  || — || January 7, 2000 || Socorro || LINEAR || — || align=right | 3.7 km || 
|-id=384 bgcolor=#E9E9E9
| 24384 ||  || — || January 7, 2000 || Socorro || LINEAR || DOR || align=right | 13 km || 
|-id=385 bgcolor=#E9E9E9
| 24385 Katcagen ||  ||  || January 7, 2000 || Socorro || LINEAR || — || align=right | 8.0 km || 
|-id=386 bgcolor=#E9E9E9
| 24386 McLindon ||  ||  || January 7, 2000 || Socorro || LINEAR || — || align=right | 6.7 km || 
|-id=387 bgcolor=#E9E9E9
| 24387 Trettel ||  ||  || January 7, 2000 || Socorro || LINEAR || — || align=right | 5.9 km || 
|-id=388 bgcolor=#d6d6d6
| 24388 ||  || — || January 7, 2000 || Socorro || LINEAR || AEG || align=right | 20 km || 
|-id=389 bgcolor=#E9E9E9
| 24389 ||  || — || January 7, 2000 || Socorro || LINEAR || — || align=right | 5.2 km || 
|-id=390 bgcolor=#C2FFFF
| 24390 ||  || — || January 7, 2000 || Socorro || LINEAR || L4 || align=right | 25 km || 
|-id=391 bgcolor=#E9E9E9
| 24391 ||  || — || January 7, 2000 || Socorro || LINEAR || — || align=right | 7.1 km || 
|-id=392 bgcolor=#d6d6d6
| 24392 ||  || — || January 7, 2000 || Socorro || LINEAR || — || align=right | 12 km || 
|-id=393 bgcolor=#d6d6d6
| 24393 ||  || — || January 7, 2000 || Socorro || LINEAR || EOS || align=right | 5.1 km || 
|-id=394 bgcolor=#fefefe
| 24394 ||  || — || January 8, 2000 || Socorro || LINEAR || — || align=right | 3.2 km || 
|-id=395 bgcolor=#fefefe
| 24395 ||  || — || January 8, 2000 || Socorro || LINEAR || — || align=right | 2.4 km || 
|-id=396 bgcolor=#d6d6d6
| 24396 ||  || — || January 8, 2000 || Socorro || LINEAR || — || align=right | 7.5 km || 
|-id=397 bgcolor=#fefefe
| 24397 Parkerowan ||  ||  || January 8, 2000 || Socorro || LINEAR || — || align=right | 3.3 km || 
|-id=398 bgcolor=#E9E9E9
| 24398 ||  || — || January 8, 2000 || Socorro || LINEAR || — || align=right | 4.0 km || 
|-id=399 bgcolor=#E9E9E9
| 24399 ||  || — || January 8, 2000 || Socorro || LINEAR || EUN || align=right | 3.0 km || 
|-id=400 bgcolor=#d6d6d6
| 24400 ||  || — || January 8, 2000 || Socorro || LINEAR || URS || align=right | 10 km || 
|}

24401–24500 

|-bgcolor=#E9E9E9
| 24401 ||  || — || January 8, 2000 || Socorro || LINEAR || — || align=right | 4.3 km || 
|-id=402 bgcolor=#E9E9E9
| 24402 ||  || — || January 8, 2000 || Socorro || LINEAR || — || align=right | 8.9 km || 
|-id=403 bgcolor=#C2FFFF
| 24403 ||  || — || January 8, 2000 || Socorro || LINEAR || L4 || align=right | 29 km || 
|-id=404 bgcolor=#d6d6d6
| 24404 ||  || — || January 8, 2000 || Socorro || LINEAR || EOS || align=right | 9.8 km || 
|-id=405 bgcolor=#d6d6d6
| 24405 ||  || — || January 8, 2000 || Socorro || LINEAR || EOS || align=right | 5.6 km || 
|-id=406 bgcolor=#E9E9E9
| 24406 ||  || — || January 9, 2000 || Socorro || LINEAR || — || align=right | 5.8 km || 
|-id=407 bgcolor=#E9E9E9
| 24407 ||  || — || January 9, 2000 || Socorro || LINEAR || — || align=right | 8.8 km || 
|-id=408 bgcolor=#d6d6d6
| 24408 ||  || — || January 6, 2000 || Kitt Peak || Spacewatch || — || align=right | 10 km || 
|-id=409 bgcolor=#d6d6d6
| 24409 Caninquinn ||  ||  || January 5, 2000 || Socorro || LINEAR || — || align=right | 7.2 km || 
|-id=410 bgcolor=#fefefe
| 24410 Juliewalker ||  ||  || January 5, 2000 || Socorro || LINEAR || FLO || align=right | 3.5 km || 
|-id=411 bgcolor=#E9E9E9
| 24411 Janches ||  ||  || January 7, 2000 || Anderson Mesa || LONEOS || ADE || align=right | 9.0 km || 
|-id=412 bgcolor=#d6d6d6
| 24412 Ericpalmer ||  ||  || January 7, 2000 || Anderson Mesa || LONEOS || — || align=right | 19 km || 
|-id=413 bgcolor=#d6d6d6
| 24413 Britneyschmidt ||  ||  || January 7, 2000 || Anderson Mesa || LONEOS || — || align=right | 12 km || 
|-id=414 bgcolor=#E9E9E9
| 24414 ||  || — || January 13, 2000 || Xinglong || SCAP || — || align=right | 10 km || 
|-id=415 bgcolor=#d6d6d6
| 24415 ||  || — || January 3, 2000 || Socorro || LINEAR || THM || align=right | 8.7 km || 
|-id=416 bgcolor=#d6d6d6
| 24416 ||  || — || January 25, 2000 || Višnjan Observatory || K. Korlević || THM || align=right | 9.2 km || 
|-id=417 bgcolor=#E9E9E9
| 24417 ||  || — || January 27, 2000 || Socorro || LINEAR || — || align=right | 7.5 km || 
|-id=418 bgcolor=#E9E9E9
| 24418 ||  || — || January 27, 2000 || Socorro || LINEAR || — || align=right | 9.3 km || 
|-id=419 bgcolor=#E9E9E9
| 24419 ||  || — || January 29, 2000 || Socorro || LINEAR || — || align=right | 5.2 km || 
|-id=420 bgcolor=#C2FFFF
| 24420 Thasos ||  ||  || January 29, 2000 || Kitt Peak || Spacewatch || L4ERY || align=right | 22 km || 
|-id=421 bgcolor=#E9E9E9
| 24421 Djorgovski ||  ||  || January 30, 2000 || Catalina || CSS || AGN || align=right | 8.8 km || 
|-id=422 bgcolor=#fefefe
| 24422 Helentressa ||  ||  || February 2, 2000 || Socorro || LINEAR || V || align=right | 2.3 km || 
|-id=423 bgcolor=#d6d6d6
| 24423 ||  || — || February 2, 2000 || Socorro || LINEAR || EOS || align=right | 8.3 km || 
|-id=424 bgcolor=#d6d6d6
| 24424 ||  || — || February 2, 2000 || Socorro || LINEAR || — || align=right | 5.9 km || 
|-id=425 bgcolor=#E9E9E9
| 24425 ||  || — || February 2, 2000 || Socorro || LINEAR || — || align=right | 6.8 km || 
|-id=426 bgcolor=#C2FFFF
| 24426 Belova ||  ||  || February 2, 2000 || Socorro || LINEAR || L4ERY || align=right | 14 km || 
|-id=427 bgcolor=#E9E9E9
| 24427 ||  || — || February 2, 2000 || Socorro || LINEAR || JUN || align=right | 9.3 km || 
|-id=428 bgcolor=#E9E9E9
| 24428 ||  || — || February 2, 2000 || Socorro || LINEAR || — || align=right | 6.0 km || 
|-id=429 bgcolor=#d6d6d6
| 24429 ||  || — || February 2, 2000 || Socorro || LINEAR || THM || align=right | 11 km || 
|-id=430 bgcolor=#E9E9E9
| 24430 ||  || — || February 2, 2000 || Socorro || LINEAR || — || align=right | 3.9 km || 
|-id=431 bgcolor=#d6d6d6
| 24431 ||  || — || February 2, 2000 || Socorro || LINEAR || VER || align=right | 14 km || 
|-id=432 bgcolor=#E9E9E9
| 24432 Elizamcnitt ||  ||  || February 2, 2000 || Socorro || LINEAR || — || align=right | 3.6 km || 
|-id=433 bgcolor=#E9E9E9
| 24433 ||  || — || February 4, 2000 || Socorro || LINEAR || GEF || align=right | 6.7 km || 
|-id=434 bgcolor=#E9E9E9
| 24434 Josephhoscheidt ||  ||  || February 7, 2000 || Catalina || CSS || — || align=right | 8.6 km || 
|-id=435 bgcolor=#d6d6d6
| 24435 || 2000 DN || — || February 23, 2000 || Višnjan Observatory || K. Korlević || — || align=right | 8.1 km || 
|-id=436 bgcolor=#fefefe
| 24436 ||  || — || March 8, 2000 || Socorro || LINEAR || ERI || align=right | 7.8 km || 
|-id=437 bgcolor=#d6d6d6
| 24437 ||  || — || March 9, 2000 || Socorro || LINEAR || EOS || align=right | 8.2 km || 
|-id=438 bgcolor=#fefefe
| 24438 Michaeloy ||  ||  || March 9, 2000 || Socorro || LINEAR || V || align=right | 2.2 km || 
|-id=439 bgcolor=#d6d6d6
| 24439 Yanney ||  ||  || March 3, 2000 || Catalina || CSS || — || align=right | 16 km || 
|-id=440 bgcolor=#d6d6d6
| 24440 ||  || — || March 26, 2000 || Socorro || LINEAR || EUP || align=right | 25 km || 
|-id=441 bgcolor=#fefefe
| 24441 Jopek ||  ||  || March 27, 2000 || Anderson Mesa || LONEOS || FLO || align=right | 2.7 km || 
|-id=442 bgcolor=#E9E9E9
| 24442 ||  || — || April 10, 2000 || Haleakala || NEAT || — || align=right | 5.0 km || 
|-id=443 bgcolor=#FFC2E0
| 24443 || 2000 OG || — || July 21, 2000 || Socorro || LINEAR || APO +1km || align=right | 1.9 km || 
|-id=444 bgcolor=#C2FFFF
| 24444 ||  || — || July 30, 2000 || Socorro || LINEAR || L5 || align=right | 24 km || 
|-id=445 bgcolor=#FFC2E0
| 24445 ||  || — || August 2, 2000 || Mauna Kea || C. Veillet || APO +1km || align=right | 4.1 km || 
|-id=446 bgcolor=#C2FFFF
| 24446 ||  || — || August 4, 2000 || Socorro || LINEAR || L5 || align=right | 31 km || 
|-id=447 bgcolor=#FA8072
| 24447 ||  || — || August 24, 2000 || Socorro || LINEAR || — || align=right data-sort-value="0.97" | 970 m || 
|-id=448 bgcolor=#C2FFFF
| 24448 ||  || — || August 24, 2000 || Socorro || LINEAR || L5 || align=right | 26 km || 
|-id=449 bgcolor=#C2FFFF
| 24449 ||  || — || August 28, 2000 || Socorro || LINEAR || L5 || align=right | 23 km || 
|-id=450 bgcolor=#d6d6d6
| 24450 Victorchang ||  ||  || August 29, 2000 || Reedy Creek || J. Broughton || — || align=right | 4.5 km || 
|-id=451 bgcolor=#C2FFFF
| 24451 ||  || — || August 28, 2000 || Socorro || LINEAR || L5 || align=right | 41 km || 
|-id=452 bgcolor=#C2FFFF
| 24452 ||  || — || August 31, 2000 || Socorro || LINEAR || L5 || align=right | 19 km || 
|-id=453 bgcolor=#C2FFFF
| 24453 ||  || — || August 31, 2000 || Socorro || LINEAR || L5 || align=right | 28 km || 
|-id=454 bgcolor=#C2FFFF
| 24454 ||  || — || August 29, 2000 || Socorro || LINEAR || L5slow? || align=right | 28 km || 
|-id=455 bgcolor=#d6d6d6
| 24455 Kaňuchová ||  ||  || August 21, 2000 || Anderson Mesa || LONEOS || — || align=right | 9.4 km || 
|-id=456 bgcolor=#C2FFFF
| 24456 ||  || — || September 1, 2000 || Socorro || LINEAR || L5 || align=right | 21 km || 
|-id=457 bgcolor=#fefefe
| 24457 ||  || — || September 6, 2000 || Socorro || LINEAR || H || align=right | 3.4 km || 
|-id=458 bgcolor=#C2FFFF
| 24458 ||  || — || September 5, 2000 || Anderson Mesa || LONEOS || L5 || align=right | 26 km || 
|-id=459 bgcolor=#C2FFFF
| 24459 ||  || — || September 5, 2000 || Anderson Mesa || LONEOS || L5 || align=right | 28 km || 
|-id=460 bgcolor=#E9E9E9
| 24460 ||  || — || September 7, 2000 || Socorro || LINEAR || EUN || align=right | 5.5 km || 
|-id=461 bgcolor=#d6d6d6
| 24461 ||  || — || September 20, 2000 || Socorro || LINEAR || — || align=right | 10 km || 
|-id=462 bgcolor=#d6d6d6
| 24462 ||  || — || September 24, 2000 || Socorro || LINEAR || — || align=right | 5.5 km || 
|-id=463 bgcolor=#E9E9E9
| 24463 ||  || — || September 24, 2000 || Socorro || LINEAR || — || align=right | 12 km || 
|-id=464 bgcolor=#fefefe
| 24464 Williamkalb ||  ||  || September 24, 2000 || Socorro || LINEAR || — || align=right | 3.7 km || 
|-id=465 bgcolor=#fefefe
| 24465 ||  || — || September 24, 2000 || Socorro || LINEAR || Hmoon || align=right | 2.2 km || 
|-id=466 bgcolor=#d6d6d6
| 24466 ||  || — || September 24, 2000 || Socorro || LINEAR || slow || align=right | 11 km || 
|-id=467 bgcolor=#C2FFFF
| 24467 ||  || — || September 23, 2000 || Socorro || LINEAR || L5 || align=right | 21 km || 
|-id=468 bgcolor=#E9E9E9
| 24468 ||  || — || September 26, 2000 || Socorro || LINEAR || GEF || align=right | 5.7 km || 
|-id=469 bgcolor=#E9E9E9
| 24469 ||  || — || September 26, 2000 || Socorro || LINEAR || — || align=right | 4.1 km || 
|-id=470 bgcolor=#C2FFFF
| 24470 ||  || — || September 26, 2000 || Socorro || LINEAR || L5 || align=right | 33 km || 
|-id=471 bgcolor=#C2FFFF
| 24471 ||  || — || September 27, 2000 || Socorro || LINEAR || L5slow || align=right | 29 km || 
|-id=472 bgcolor=#C2FFFF
| 24472 ||  || — || September 30, 2000 || Socorro || LINEAR || L5 || align=right | 29 km || 
|-id=473 bgcolor=#fefefe
| 24473 ||  || — || October 25, 2000 || Socorro || LINEAR || FLO || align=right | 5.3 km || 
|-id=474 bgcolor=#fefefe
| 24474 Ananthram ||  ||  || November 1, 2000 || Socorro || LINEAR || — || align=right | 3.3 km || 
|-id=475 bgcolor=#FFC2E0
| 24475 ||  || — || November 1, 2000 || Socorro || LINEAR || AMO +1km || align=right | 2.0 km || 
|-id=476 bgcolor=#E9E9E9
| 24476 ||  || — || November 29, 2000 || Fountain Hills || C. W. Juels || EUN || align=right | 4.7 km || 
|-id=477 bgcolor=#d6d6d6
| 24477 ||  || — || November 20, 2000 || Socorro || LINEAR || — || align=right | 12 km || 
|-id=478 bgcolor=#d6d6d6
| 24478 ||  || — || November 21, 2000 || Socorro || LINEAR || EUP || align=right | 19 km || 
|-id=479 bgcolor=#C2FFFF
| 24479 ||  || — || November 30, 2000 || Socorro || LINEAR || L4 || align=right | 24 km || 
|-id=480 bgcolor=#E9E9E9
| 24480 Glavin ||  ||  || November 19, 2000 || Anderson Mesa || LONEOS || — || align=right | 7.1 km || 
|-id=481 bgcolor=#fefefe
| 24481 ||  || — || December 1, 2000 || Socorro || LINEAR || H || align=right | 1.7 km || 
|-id=482 bgcolor=#E9E9E9
| 24482 ||  || — || December 4, 2000 || Socorro || LINEAR || — || align=right | 7.8 km || 
|-id=483 bgcolor=#fefefe
| 24483 ||  || — || December 4, 2000 || Socorro || LINEAR || — || align=right | 3.1 km || 
|-id=484 bgcolor=#fefefe
| 24484 Chester ||  ||  || December 30, 2000 || Socorro || LINEAR || — || align=right | 2.9 km || 
|-id=485 bgcolor=#C2FFFF
| 24485 ||  || — || December 28, 2000 || Socorro || LINEAR || L4 || align=right | 26 km || 
|-id=486 bgcolor=#C2FFFF
| 24486 ||  || — || December 28, 2000 || Socorro || LINEAR || L4 || align=right | 33 km || 
|-id=487 bgcolor=#E9E9E9
| 24487 ||  || — || December 28, 2000 || Socorro || LINEAR || — || align=right | 4.4 km || 
|-id=488 bgcolor=#fefefe
| 24488 Eliebochner ||  ||  || December 30, 2000 || Socorro || LINEAR || FLO || align=right | 2.4 km || 
|-id=489 bgcolor=#fefefe
| 24489 ||  || — || December 30, 2000 || Socorro || LINEAR || — || align=right | 2.1 km || 
|-id=490 bgcolor=#fefefe
| 24490 ||  || — || December 28, 2000 || Socorro || LINEAR || — || align=right | 3.5 km || 
|-id=491 bgcolor=#d6d6d6
| 24491 ||  || — || December 28, 2000 || Socorro || LINEAR || 2:1J || align=right | 9.5 km || 
|-id=492 bgcolor=#E9E9E9
| 24492 Nathanmonroe ||  ||  || December 30, 2000 || Socorro || LINEAR || — || align=right | 2.6 km || 
|-id=493 bgcolor=#d6d6d6
| 24493 McCommon ||  ||  || December 30, 2000 || Socorro || LINEAR || KOR || align=right | 3.5 km || 
|-id=494 bgcolor=#fefefe
| 24494 Megmoulding ||  ||  || December 30, 2000 || Socorro || LINEAR || — || align=right | 5.2 km || 
|-id=495 bgcolor=#FA8072
| 24495 Degroff ||  ||  || January 2, 2001 || Anderson Mesa || LONEOS || moon || align=right | 3.0 km || 
|-id=496 bgcolor=#E9E9E9
| 24496 ||  || — || January 2, 2001 || Socorro || LINEAR || — || align=right | 2.6 km || 
|-id=497 bgcolor=#d6d6d6
| 24497 ||  || — || January 2, 2001 || Socorro || LINEAR || — || align=right | 13 km || 
|-id=498 bgcolor=#C2FFFF
| 24498 ||  || — || January 4, 2001 || Socorro || LINEAR || L4 || align=right | 22 km || 
|-id=499 bgcolor=#E9E9E9
| 24499 ||  || — || January 4, 2001 || Socorro || LINEAR || — || align=right | 4.0 km || 
|-id=500 bgcolor=#E9E9E9
| 24500 ||  || — || January 4, 2001 || Socorro || LINEAR || — || align=right | 7.8 km || 
|}

24501–24600 

|-bgcolor=#C2FFFF
| 24501 ||  || — || January 5, 2001 || Socorro || LINEAR || L4 || align=right | 25 km || 
|-id=502 bgcolor=#E9E9E9
| 24502 ||  || — || January 1, 2001 || Kitt Peak || Spacewatch || — || align=right | 2.9 km || 
|-id=503 bgcolor=#E9E9E9
| 24503 Kero ||  ||  || January 3, 2001 || Anderson Mesa || LONEOS || MAR || align=right | 6.1 km || 
|-id=504 bgcolor=#fefefe
| 24504 ||  || — || January 15, 2001 || Oizumi || T. Kobayashi || — || align=right | 1.6 km || 
|-id=505 bgcolor=#C2FFFF
| 24505 || 2001 BZ || — || January 17, 2001 || Oizumi || T. Kobayashi || L4 || align=right | 32 km || 
|-id=506 bgcolor=#C2FFFF
| 24506 ||  || — || January 21, 2001 || Oizumi || T. Kobayashi || L4 || align=right | 39 km || 
|-id=507 bgcolor=#E9E9E9
| 24507 ||  || — || January 19, 2001 || Socorro || LINEAR || EUN || align=right | 4.4 km || 
|-id=508 bgcolor=#C2FFFF
| 24508 ||  || — || January 20, 2001 || Socorro || LINEAR || L4 || align=right | 20 km || 
|-id=509 bgcolor=#fefefe
| 24509 Joycechai ||  ||  || January 20, 2001 || Socorro || LINEAR || NYS || align=right | 1.6 km || 
|-id=510 bgcolor=#d6d6d6
| 24510 ||  || — || January 20, 2001 || Socorro || LINEAR || ALA || align=right | 13 km || 
|-id=511 bgcolor=#fefefe
| 24511 ||  || — || January 20, 2001 || Socorro || LINEAR || — || align=right | 2.4 km || 
|-id=512 bgcolor=#d6d6d6
| 24512 ||  || — || January 20, 2001 || Socorro || LINEAR || MEL || align=right | 12 km || 
|-id=513 bgcolor=#d6d6d6
| 24513 ||  || — || January 20, 2001 || Socorro || LINEAR || ALA || align=right | 14 km || 
|-id=514 bgcolor=#d6d6d6
| 24514 ||  || — || January 21, 2001 || Socorro || LINEAR || 2:1J || align=right | 8.5 km || 
|-id=515 bgcolor=#d6d6d6
| 24515 ||  || — || January 21, 2001 || Socorro || LINEAR || — || align=right | 8.5 km || 
|-id=516 bgcolor=#E9E9E9
| 24516 ||  || — || January 26, 2001 || Socorro || LINEAR || — || align=right | 6.3 km || 
|-id=517 bgcolor=#fefefe
| 24517 Omattage ||  ||  || January 29, 2001 || Socorro || LINEAR || FLO || align=right | 1.5 km || 
|-id=518 bgcolor=#fefefe
| 24518 ||  || — || January 26, 2001 || Kitt Peak || Spacewatch || — || align=right | 2.3 km || 
|-id=519 bgcolor=#C2FFFF
| 24519 || 2001 CH || — || February 1, 2001 || Višnjan Observatory || K. Korlević || L4 || align=right | 26 km || 
|-id=520 bgcolor=#fefefe
| 24520 Abramson ||  ||  || February 1, 2001 || Socorro || LINEAR || — || align=right | 8.5 km || 
|-id=521 bgcolor=#E9E9E9
| 24521 ||  || — || February 1, 2001 || Socorro || LINEAR || — || align=right | 5.2 km || 
|-id=522 bgcolor=#E9E9E9
| 24522 ||  || — || February 1, 2001 || Socorro || LINEAR || — || align=right | 3.7 km || 
|-id=523 bgcolor=#fefefe
| 24523 Sanaraoof ||  ||  || February 1, 2001 || Socorro || LINEAR || FLO || align=right | 2.6 km || 
|-id=524 bgcolor=#fefefe
| 24524 Kevinhawkins ||  ||  || February 1, 2001 || Socorro || LINEAR || — || align=right | 6.1 km || 
|-id=525 bgcolor=#fefefe
| 24525 ||  || — || February 1, 2001 || Socorro || LINEAR || — || align=right | 3.7 km || 
|-id=526 bgcolor=#E9E9E9
| 24526 Desai ||  ||  || February 1, 2001 || Socorro || LINEAR || — || align=right | 3.2 km || 
|-id=527 bgcolor=#fefefe
| 24527 ||  || — || February 1, 2001 || Socorro || LINEAR || — || align=right | 2.4 km || 
|-id=528 bgcolor=#C2FFFF
| 24528 ||  || — || February 1, 2001 || Socorro || LINEAR || L4 || align=right | 25 km || 
|-id=529 bgcolor=#fefefe
| 24529 Urbach ||  ||  || February 2, 2001 || Socorro || LINEAR || V || align=right | 1.7 km || 
|-id=530 bgcolor=#C2FFFF
| 24530 ||  || — || February 2, 2001 || Socorro || LINEAR || L4 || align=right | 26 km || 
|-id=531 bgcolor=#C2FFFF
| 24531 ||  || — || February 2, 2001 || Socorro || LINEAR || L4 || align=right | 21 km || 
|-id=532 bgcolor=#E9E9E9
| 24532 Csabakiss ||  ||  || February 1, 2001 || Anderson Mesa || LONEOS || — || align=right | 2.2 km || 
|-id=533 bgcolor=#d6d6d6
| 24533 Kokhirova ||  ||  || February 2, 2001 || Anderson Mesa || LONEOS || EOS || align=right | 9.3 km || 
|-id=534 bgcolor=#C2FFFF
| 24534 ||  || — || February 2, 2001 || Anderson Mesa || LONEOS || L4 || align=right | 30 km || 
|-id=535 bgcolor=#E9E9E9
| 24535 Neslušan ||  ||  || February 2, 2001 || Anderson Mesa || LONEOS || MAR || align=right | 2.6 km || 
|-id=536 bgcolor=#C2FFFF
| 24536 ||  || — || February 13, 2001 || Socorro || LINEAR || L4 || align=right | 27 km || 
|-id=537 bgcolor=#C2FFFF
| 24537 ||  || — || February 13, 2001 || Socorro || LINEAR || L4 || align=right | 31 km || 
|-id=538 bgcolor=#fefefe
| 24538 Charliexie ||  ||  || February 16, 2001 || Socorro || LINEAR || — || align=right | 2.3 km || 
|-id=539 bgcolor=#C2FFFF
| 24539 ||  || — || February 16, 2001 || Socorro || LINEAR || L4 || align=right | 15 km || 
|-id=540 bgcolor=#E9E9E9
| 24540 ||  || — || February 16, 2001 || Socorro || LINEAR || — || align=right | 2.6 km || 
|-id=541 bgcolor=#fefefe
| 24541 Hangzou ||  ||  || February 16, 2001 || Socorro || LINEAR || FLO || align=right | 2.7 km || 
|-id=542 bgcolor=#d6d6d6
| 24542 ||  || — || February 16, 2001 || Socorro || LINEAR || — || align=right | 5.1 km || 
|-id=543 bgcolor=#fefefe
| 24543 ||  || — || February 16, 2001 || Socorro || LINEAR || — || align=right | 3.6 km || 
|-id=544 bgcolor=#E9E9E9
| 24544 ||  || — || February 16, 2001 || Socorro || LINEAR || MAR || align=right | 6.6 km || 
|-id=545 bgcolor=#E9E9E9
| 24545 ||  || — || February 17, 2001 || Socorro || LINEAR || — || align=right | 3.7 km || 
|-id=546 bgcolor=#E9E9E9
| 24546 Darnell ||  ||  || February 19, 2001 || Socorro || LINEAR || — || align=right | 2.1 km || 
|-id=547 bgcolor=#fefefe
| 24547 Stauber ||  ||  || February 19, 2001 || Socorro || LINEAR || — || align=right | 1.7 km || 
|-id=548 bgcolor=#fefefe
| 24548 Katieeverett ||  ||  || February 19, 2001 || Socorro || LINEAR || — || align=right | 2.0 km || 
|-id=549 bgcolor=#d6d6d6
| 24549 Jaredgoodman ||  ||  || February 19, 2001 || Socorro || LINEAR || — || align=right | 7.2 km || 
|-id=550 bgcolor=#d6d6d6
| 24550 ||  || — || February 19, 2001 || Socorro || LINEAR || 7:4 || align=right | 8.0 km || 
|-id=551 bgcolor=#E9E9E9
| 24551 || 2048 P-L || — || September 24, 1960 || Palomar || PLS || — || align=right | 9.1 km || 
|-id=552 bgcolor=#E9E9E9
| 24552 || 2226 P-L || — || September 24, 1960 || Palomar || PLS || — || align=right | 2.4 km || 
|-id=553 bgcolor=#fefefe
| 24553 || 2590 P-L || — || September 24, 1960 || Palomar || PLS || — || align=right | 2.7 km || 
|-id=554 bgcolor=#d6d6d6
| 24554 || 2608 P-L || — || September 24, 1960 || Palomar || PLS || EOS || align=right | 5.5 km || 
|-id=555 bgcolor=#E9E9E9
| 24555 || 2839 P-L || — || September 24, 1960 || Palomar || PLS || — || align=right | 4.4 km || 
|-id=556 bgcolor=#E9E9E9
| 24556 || 3514 P-L || — || October 17, 1960 || Palomar || PLS || — || align=right | 4.0 km || 
|-id=557 bgcolor=#E9E9E9
| 24557 || 3521 P-L || — || October 17, 1960 || Palomar || PLS || — || align=right | 4.0 km || 
|-id=558 bgcolor=#fefefe
| 24558 || 4037 P-L || — || September 24, 1960 || Palomar || PLS || V || align=right | 2.8 km || 
|-id=559 bgcolor=#E9E9E9
| 24559 || 4148 P-L || — || September 24, 1960 || Palomar || PLS || — || align=right | 3.5 km || 
|-id=560 bgcolor=#fefefe
| 24560 || 4517 P-L || — || September 24, 1960 || Palomar || PLS || — || align=right | 4.3 km || 
|-id=561 bgcolor=#d6d6d6
| 24561 || 4646 P-L || — || September 24, 1960 || Palomar || PLS || — || align=right | 15 km || 
|-id=562 bgcolor=#fefefe
| 24562 || 4647 P-L || — || September 24, 1960 || Palomar || PLS || — || align=right | 4.4 km || 
|-id=563 bgcolor=#d6d6d6
| 24563 || 4858 P-L || — || September 24, 1960 || Palomar || PLS || — || align=right | 4.2 km || 
|-id=564 bgcolor=#fefefe
| 24564 || 6056 P-L || — || September 24, 1960 || Palomar || PLS || — || align=right | 2.8 km || 
|-id=565 bgcolor=#E9E9E9
| 24565 || 6577 P-L || — || September 24, 1960 || Palomar || PLS || — || align=right | 5.0 km || 
|-id=566 bgcolor=#d6d6d6
| 24566 || 6777 P-L || — || September 24, 1960 || Palomar || PLS || — || align=right | 7.3 km || 
|-id=567 bgcolor=#fefefe
| 24567 || 6790 P-L || — || September 24, 1960 || Palomar || PLS || NYS || align=right | 1.8 km || 
|-id=568 bgcolor=#fefefe
| 24568 || 6794 P-L || — || September 24, 1960 || Palomar || PLS || NYS || align=right | 2.1 km || 
|-id=569 bgcolor=#fefefe
| 24569 || 9609 P-L || — || September 24, 1960 || Palomar || PLS || — || align=right | 2.2 km || 
|-id=570 bgcolor=#d6d6d6
| 24570 || 2153 T-1 || — || March 25, 1971 || Palomar || PLS || KOR || align=right | 5.0 km || 
|-id=571 bgcolor=#fefefe
| 24571 || 2179 T-1 || — || March 25, 1971 || Palomar || PLS || V || align=right | 1.6 km || 
|-id=572 bgcolor=#d6d6d6
| 24572 || 2221 T-1 || — || March 25, 1971 || Palomar || PLS || KOR || align=right | 4.1 km || 
|-id=573 bgcolor=#fefefe
| 24573 || 2237 T-1 || — || March 25, 1971 || Palomar || PLS || V || align=right | 1.8 km || 
|-id=574 bgcolor=#E9E9E9
| 24574 || 3312 T-1 || — || March 26, 1971 || Palomar || PLS || HEN || align=right | 2.7 km || 
|-id=575 bgcolor=#E9E9E9
| 24575 || 3314 T-1 || — || March 26, 1971 || Palomar || PLS || EUN || align=right | 3.2 km || 
|-id=576 bgcolor=#E9E9E9
| 24576 || 4406 T-1 || — || March 26, 1971 || Palomar || PLS || — || align=right | 4.3 km || 
|-id=577 bgcolor=#E9E9E9
| 24577 || 4841 T-1 || — || May 13, 1971 || Palomar || PLS || EUN || align=right | 5.0 km || 
|-id=578 bgcolor=#fefefe
| 24578 || 1036 T-2 || — || September 29, 1973 || Palomar || PLS || — || align=right | 5.7 km || 
|-id=579 bgcolor=#d6d6d6
| 24579 || 1320 T-2 || — || September 29, 1973 || Palomar || PLS || — || align=right | 3.9 km || 
|-id=580 bgcolor=#E9E9E9
| 24580 || 1414 T-2 || — || September 30, 1973 || Palomar || PLS || — || align=right | 3.2 km || 
|-id=581 bgcolor=#fefefe
| 24581 || 1474 T-2 || — || September 30, 1973 || Palomar || PLS || FLO || align=right | 1.8 km || 
|-id=582 bgcolor=#E9E9E9
| 24582 || 2085 T-2 || — || September 29, 1973 || Palomar || PLS || — || align=right | 4.7 km || 
|-id=583 bgcolor=#E9E9E9
| 24583 || 2197 T-2 || — || September 29, 1973 || Palomar || PLS || — || align=right | 4.1 km || 
|-id=584 bgcolor=#fefefe
| 24584 || 3256 T-2 || — || September 30, 1973 || Palomar || PLS || — || align=right | 1.9 km || 
|-id=585 bgcolor=#d6d6d6
| 24585 || 4201 T-2 || — || September 29, 1973 || Palomar || PLS || CHA || align=right | 5.9 km || 
|-id=586 bgcolor=#d6d6d6
| 24586 || 4230 T-2 || — || September 29, 1973 || Palomar || PLS || KOR || align=right | 4.1 km || 
|-id=587 bgcolor=#C2FFFF
| 24587 Kapaneus || 4613 T-2 ||  || September 30, 1973 || Palomar || PLS || L4 || align=right | 26 km || 
|-id=588 bgcolor=#E9E9E9
| 24588 || 4733 T-2 || — || September 30, 1973 || Palomar || PLS || — || align=right | 3.3 km || 
|-id=589 bgcolor=#E9E9E9
| 24589 || 5128 T-2 || — || September 25, 1973 || Palomar || PLS || — || align=right | 3.3 km || 
|-id=590 bgcolor=#d6d6d6
| 24590 || 1156 T-3 || — || October 17, 1977 || Palomar || PLS || EOS || align=right | 5.8 km || 
|-id=591 bgcolor=#E9E9E9
| 24591 || 2139 T-3 || — || October 16, 1977 || Palomar || PLS || — || align=right | 5.5 km || 
|-id=592 bgcolor=#E9E9E9
| 24592 || 3039 T-3 || — || October 16, 1977 || Palomar || PLS || — || align=right | 4.2 km || 
|-id=593 bgcolor=#E9E9E9
| 24593 || 3041 T-3 || — || October 16, 1977 || Palomar || PLS || — || align=right | 4.0 km || 
|-id=594 bgcolor=#fefefe
| 24594 || 3138 T-3 || — || October 16, 1977 || Palomar || PLS || — || align=right | 4.6 km || 
|-id=595 bgcolor=#d6d6d6
| 24595 || 3230 T-3 || — || October 16, 1977 || Palomar || PLS || HYG || align=right | 4.5 km || 
|-id=596 bgcolor=#d6d6d6
| 24596 || 3574 T-3 || — || October 12, 1977 || Palomar || PLS || — || align=right | 7.4 km || 
|-id=597 bgcolor=#E9E9E9
| 24597 || 4292 T-3 || — || October 16, 1977 || Palomar || PLS || — || align=right | 3.4 km || 
|-id=598 bgcolor=#fefefe
| 24598 || 4366 T-3 || — || October 16, 1977 || Palomar || PLS || NYS || align=right | 1.8 km || 
|-id=599 bgcolor=#d6d6d6
| 24599 || 5099 T-3 || — || October 16, 1977 || Palomar || PLS || EOS || align=right | 5.2 km || 
|-id=600 bgcolor=#fefefe
| 24600 || 1971 UQ || — || October 26, 1971 || Hamburg-Bergedorf || L. Kohoutek || — || align=right | 4.2 km || 
|}

24601–24700 

|-bgcolor=#fefefe
| 24601 Valjean || 1971 UW ||  || October 26, 1971 || Hamburg-Bergedorf || L. Kohoutek || FLO || align=right | 2.6 km || 
|-id=602 bgcolor=#E9E9E9
| 24602 Mozzhorin || 1972 TE ||  || October 3, 1972 || Nauchnij || L. V. Zhuravleva || — || align=right | 4.6 km || 
|-id=603 bgcolor=#C2FFFF
| 24603 Mekistheus || 1973 SQ ||  || September 24, 1973 || Palomar || PLS || L4 || align=right | 18 km || 
|-id=604 bgcolor=#fefefe
| 24604 Vasilermakov ||  ||  || September 27, 1973 || Nauchnij || L. I. Chernykh || — || align=right | 4.6 km || 
|-id=605 bgcolor=#E9E9E9
| 24605 Tsykalyuk ||  ||  || November 8, 1975 || Nauchnij || N. S. Chernykh || — || align=right | 6.7 km || 
|-id=606 bgcolor=#E9E9E9
| 24606 ||  || — || August 20, 1976 || El Leoncito || Félix Aguilar Obs. || — || align=right | 3.0 km || 
|-id=607 bgcolor=#fefefe
| 24607 Sevnatu ||  ||  || August 14, 1977 || Nauchnij || N. S. Chernykh || — || align=right | 5.1 km || 
|-id=608 bgcolor=#fefefe
| 24608 Alexveselkov || 1977 SL ||  || September 18, 1977 || Nauchnij || N. S. Chernykh || NYS || align=right | 2.9 km || 
|-id=609 bgcolor=#fefefe
| 24609 Evgenij ||  ||  || September 7, 1978 || Nauchnij || T. M. Smirnova || — || align=right | 2.5 km || 
|-id=610 bgcolor=#fefefe
| 24610 ||  || — || September 2, 1978 || La Silla || C.-I. Lagerkvist || — || align=right | 2.6 km || 
|-id=611 bgcolor=#fefefe
| 24611 Svetochka ||  ||  || September 26, 1978 || Nauchnij || L. V. Zhuravleva || FLO || align=right | 4.5 km || 
|-id=612 bgcolor=#E9E9E9
| 24612 ||  || — || October 27, 1978 || Palomar || C. M. Olmstead || — || align=right | 4.2 km || 
|-id=613 bgcolor=#fefefe
| 24613 ||  || — || November 7, 1978 || Palomar || E. F. Helin, S. J. Bus || — || align=right | 3.7 km || 
|-id=614 bgcolor=#E9E9E9
| 24614 ||  || — || November 7, 1978 || Palomar || E. F. Helin, S. J. Bus || — || align=right | 2.7 km || 
|-id=615 bgcolor=#fefefe
| 24615 ||  || — || November 7, 1978 || Palomar || E. F. Helin, S. J. Bus || — || align=right | 2.2 km || 
|-id=616 bgcolor=#E9E9E9
| 24616 ||  || — || November 7, 1978 || Palomar || E. F. Helin, S. J. Bus || — || align=right | 2.7 km || 
|-id=617 bgcolor=#E9E9E9
| 24617 || 1978 WU || — || November 29, 1978 || Palomar || S. J. Bus, C. T. Kowal || — || align=right | 3.1 km || 
|-id=618 bgcolor=#d6d6d6
| 24618 ||  || — || December 6, 1978 || Palomar || E. Bowell, A. Warnock || — || align=right | 3.5 km || 
|-id=619 bgcolor=#E9E9E9
| 24619 || 1979 DA || — || February 26, 1979 || Kleť || A. Mrkos || — || align=right | 8.2 km || 
|-id=620 bgcolor=#fefefe
| 24620 ||  || — || June 25, 1979 || Siding Spring || E. F. Helin, S. J. Bus || FLO || align=right | 1.6 km || 
|-id=621 bgcolor=#fefefe
| 24621 ||  || — || June 25, 1979 || Siding Spring || E. F. Helin, S. J. Bus || NYS || align=right | 1.7 km || 
|-id=622 bgcolor=#fefefe
| 24622 ||  || — || June 25, 1979 || Siding Spring || E. F. Helin, S. J. Bus || — || align=right | 1.8 km || 
|-id=623 bgcolor=#E9E9E9
| 24623 ||  || — || June 25, 1979 || Siding Spring || E. F. Helin, S. J. Bus || GEF || align=right | 4.5 km || 
|-id=624 bgcolor=#fefefe
| 24624 ||  || — || March 16, 1980 || La Silla || C.-I. Lagerkvist || — || align=right | 1.9 km || 
|-id=625 bgcolor=#E9E9E9
| 24625 ||  || — || August 8, 1980 || Siding Spring || Edinburgh Obs. || — || align=right | 4.6 km || 
|-id=626 bgcolor=#E9E9E9
| 24626 Astrowizard ||  ||  || October 9, 1980 || Palomar || C. S. Shoemaker, E. M. Shoemaker || — || align=right | 6.5 km || 
|-id=627 bgcolor=#d6d6d6
| 24627 ||  || — || February 28, 1981 || Siding Spring || S. J. Bus || EOS || align=right | 5.8 km || 
|-id=628 bgcolor=#d6d6d6
| 24628 ||  || — || March 2, 1981 || Siding Spring || S. J. Bus || EOS || align=right | 5.3 km || 
|-id=629 bgcolor=#fefefe
| 24629 ||  || — || March 2, 1981 || Siding Spring || S. J. Bus || — || align=right | 1.7 km || 
|-id=630 bgcolor=#d6d6d6
| 24630 ||  || — || March 1, 1981 || Siding Spring || S. J. Bus || BRA || align=right | 5.4 km || 
|-id=631 bgcolor=#d6d6d6
| 24631 ||  || — || March 2, 1981 || Siding Spring || S. J. Bus || — || align=right | 6.4 km || 
|-id=632 bgcolor=#fefefe
| 24632 ||  || — || March 2, 1981 || Siding Spring || S. J. Bus || — || align=right | 2.3 km || 
|-id=633 bgcolor=#d6d6d6
| 24633 ||  || — || March 2, 1981 || Siding Spring || S. J. Bus || — || align=right | 3.0 km || 
|-id=634 bgcolor=#E9E9E9
| 24634 ||  || — || March 2, 1981 || Siding Spring || S. J. Bus || — || align=right | 4.2 km || 
|-id=635 bgcolor=#fefefe
| 24635 ||  || — || March 2, 1981 || Siding Spring || S. J. Bus || — || align=right | 2.3 km || 
|-id=636 bgcolor=#fefefe
| 24636 ||  || — || August 27, 1981 || La Silla || H. Debehogne || — || align=right | 6.5 km || 
|-id=637 bgcolor=#E9E9E9
| 24637 Olʹgusha ||  ||  || September 8, 1981 || Nauchnij || L. V. Zhuravleva || — || align=right | 3.9 km || 
|-id=638 bgcolor=#d6d6d6
| 24638 ||  || — || October 24, 1981 || Palomar || S. J. Bus || VER || align=right | 19 km || 
|-id=639 bgcolor=#E9E9E9
| 24639 Mukhametdinov ||  ||  || October 20, 1982 || Nauchnij || L. G. Karachkina || — || align=right | 5.4 km || 
|-id=640 bgcolor=#E9E9E9
| 24640 Omiwa ||  ||  || December 13, 1982 || Kiso || H. Kosai, K. Furukawa || — || align=right | 5.9 km || 
|-id=641 bgcolor=#fefefe
| 24641 Enver ||  ||  || September 1, 1983 || Nauchnij || L. G. Karachkina || — || align=right | 4.6 km || 
|-id=642 bgcolor=#fefefe
| 24642 || 1984 SA || — || September 22, 1984 || Brorfelde || Copenhagen Obs. || — || align=right | 2.7 km || 
|-id=643 bgcolor=#FA8072
| 24643 MacCready || 1984 SS ||  || September 28, 1984 || Palomar || C. S. Shoemaker, E. M. Shoemaker || PHO || align=right | 4.3 km || 
|-id=644 bgcolor=#fefefe
| 24644 || 1985 DA || — || February 24, 1985 || Palomar || E. F. Helin || H || align=right | 2.0 km || 
|-id=645 bgcolor=#E9E9E9
| 24645 Šegon || 1985 PF ||  || August 14, 1985 || Anderson Mesa || E. Bowell || — || align=right | 5.5 km || 
|-id=646 bgcolor=#E9E9E9
| 24646 Stober || 1985 PG ||  || August 14, 1985 || Anderson Mesa || E. Bowell || RAF || align=right | 4.5 km || 
|-id=647 bgcolor=#fefefe
| 24647 Maksimachev ||  ||  || August 23, 1985 || Nauchnij || N. S. Chernykh || — || align=right | 2.7 km || 
|-id=648 bgcolor=#d6d6d6
| 24648 Evpatoria ||  ||  || September 19, 1985 || Nauchnij || N. S. Chernykh, L. I. Chernykh || — || align=right | 8.5 km || 
|-id=649 bgcolor=#d6d6d6
| 24649 Balaklava ||  ||  || September 19, 1985 || Nauchnij || N. S. Chernykh, L. I. Chernykh || — || align=right | 17 km || 
|-id=650 bgcolor=#fefefe
| 24650 || 1986 QM || — || August 25, 1986 || La Silla || H. Debehogne || NYS || align=right | 6.2 km || 
|-id=651 bgcolor=#d6d6d6
| 24651 || 1986 QU || — || August 26, 1986 || La Silla || H. Debehogne || — || align=right | 9.1 km || 
|-id=652 bgcolor=#d6d6d6
| 24652 ||  || — || August 28, 1986 || La Silla || H. Debehogne || — || align=right | 9.1 km || 
|-id=653 bgcolor=#d6d6d6
| 24653 ||  || — || September 3, 1986 || Smolyan || Bulgarian National Obs. || — || align=right | 14 km || 
|-id=654 bgcolor=#FA8072
| 24654 Fossett || 1987 KL ||  || May 29, 1987 || Palomar || C. S. Shoemaker, E. M. Shoemaker || H || align=right | 3.7 km || 
|-id=655 bgcolor=#fefefe
| 24655 || 1987 QH || — || August 25, 1987 || Palomar || S. Singer-Brewster || — || align=right | 3.8 km || 
|-id=656 bgcolor=#fefefe
| 24656 ||  || — || August 29, 1987 || La Silla || E. W. Elst || NYS || align=right | 6.6 km || 
|-id=657 bgcolor=#fefefe
| 24657 ||  || — || September 17, 1987 || La Silla || H. Debehogne || NYS || align=right | 2.0 km || 
|-id=658 bgcolor=#fefefe
| 24658 Misch || 1987 UX ||  || October 18, 1987 || Palomar || J. E. Mueller || PHO || align=right | 3.8 km || 
|-id=659 bgcolor=#E9E9E9
| 24659 ||  || — || January 14, 1988 || La Silla || H. Debehogne || — || align=right | 3.1 km || 
|-id=660 bgcolor=#E9E9E9
| 24660 ||  || — || January 28, 1988 || Siding Spring || R. H. McNaught || EUN || align=right | 4.6 km || 
|-id=661 bgcolor=#E9E9E9
| 24661 || 1988 GQ || — || April 12, 1988 || Kleť || A. Mrkos || — || align=right | 6.4 km || 
|-id=662 bgcolor=#fefefe
| 24662 Gryll || 1988 GS ||  || April 14, 1988 || Kleť || A. Mrkos || FLO || align=right | 3.7 km || 
|-id=663 bgcolor=#fefefe
| 24663 Philae ||  ||  || August 12, 1988 || Haute Provence || E. W. Elst || FLO || align=right | 3.2 km || 
|-id=664 bgcolor=#fefefe
| 24664 ||  || — || September 8, 1988 || Brorfelde || P. Jensen || V || align=right | 2.6 km || 
|-id=665 bgcolor=#fefefe
| 24665 Tolerantia ||  ||  || September 8, 1988 || Tautenburg Observatory || F. Börngen || — || align=right | 1.7 km || 
|-id=666 bgcolor=#E9E9E9
| 24666 Miesvanrohe ||  ||  || September 8, 1988 || Tautenburg Observatory || F. Börngen || — || align=right | 4.4 km || 
|-id=667 bgcolor=#fefefe
| 24667 ||  || — || September 1, 1988 || La Silla || H. Debehogne || FLO || align=right | 2.2 km || 
|-id=668 bgcolor=#fefefe
| 24668 || 1988 TV || — || October 13, 1988 || Kushiro || S. Ueda, H. Kaneda || FLO || align=right | 2.5 km || 
|-id=669 bgcolor=#fefefe
| 24669 || 1988 VV || — || November 2, 1988 || Kushiro || S. Ueda, H. Kaneda || FLO || align=right | 2.5 km || 
|-id=670 bgcolor=#fefefe
| 24670 ||  || — || November 14, 1988 || Kushiro || S. Ueda, H. Kaneda || — || align=right | 2.7 km || 
|-id=671 bgcolor=#d6d6d6
| 24671 Frankmartin ||  ||  || January 10, 1989 || Tautenburg Observatory || F. Börngen || EOS || align=right | 8.0 km || 
|-id=672 bgcolor=#E9E9E9
| 24672 || 1989 OJ || — || July 27, 1989 || Siding Spring || R. H. McNaught || — || align=right | 3.6 km || 
|-id=673 bgcolor=#fefefe
| 24673 ||  || — || September 28, 1989 || Kitami || K. Endate, K. Watanabe || FLO || align=right | 3.9 km || 
|-id=674 bgcolor=#fefefe
| 24674 ||  || — || September 26, 1989 || La Silla || E. W. Elst || — || align=right | 2.4 km || 
|-id=675 bgcolor=#E9E9E9
| 24675 || 1989 TZ || — || October 2, 1989 || Palomar || E. F. Helin || — || align=right | 4.7 km || 
|-id=676 bgcolor=#E9E9E9
| 24676 ||  || — || October 7, 1989 || La Silla || E. W. Elst || — || align=right | 3.4 km || 
|-id=677 bgcolor=#E9E9E9
| 24677 ||  || — || October 7, 1989 || La Silla || E. W. Elst || PAE || align=right | 8.9 km || 
|-id=678 bgcolor=#E9E9E9
| 24678 ||  || — || October 2, 1989 || Cerro Tololo || S. J. Bus || EUN || align=right | 5.5 km || 
|-id=679 bgcolor=#fefefe
| 24679 Van Rensbergen ||  ||  || November 3, 1989 || La Silla || E. W. Elst || — || align=right | 2.4 km || 
|-id=680 bgcolor=#fefefe
| 24680 Alleven ||  ||  || December 30, 1989 || Siding Spring || R. H. McNaught || FLO || align=right | 2.3 km || 
|-id=681 bgcolor=#fefefe
| 24681 Granados ||  ||  || December 29, 1989 || Haute Provence || E. W. Elst || — || align=right | 3.3 km || 
|-id=682 bgcolor=#FA8072
| 24682 || 1990 BH || — || January 22, 1990 || Palomar || E. F. Helin || — || align=right | 2.7 km || 
|-id=683 bgcolor=#fefefe
| 24683 ||  || — || February 26, 1990 || La Silla || H. Debehogne || PHO || align=right | 3.7 km || 
|-id=684 bgcolor=#fefefe
| 24684 ||  || — || March 2, 1990 || La Silla || E. W. Elst || FLO || align=right | 2.4 km || 
|-id=685 bgcolor=#E9E9E9
| 24685 || 1990 FQ || — || March 23, 1990 || Palomar || E. F. Helin || MIT || align=right | 8.6 km || 
|-id=686 bgcolor=#fefefe
| 24686 || 1990 GN || — || April 15, 1990 || La Silla || E. W. Elst || NYS || align=right | 2.4 km || 
|-id=687 bgcolor=#fefefe
| 24687 || 1990 HW || — || April 26, 1990 || Palomar || E. F. Helin || H || align=right | 1.7 km || 
|-id=688 bgcolor=#d6d6d6
| 24688 ||  || — || May 20, 1990 || Siding Spring || R. H. McNaught || — || align=right | 14 km || 
|-id=689 bgcolor=#d6d6d6
| 24689 ||  || — || July 20, 1990 || Palomar || J. Michaud || Tj (2.98) || align=right | 17 km || 
|-id=690 bgcolor=#E9E9E9
| 24690 ||  || — || August 29, 1990 || Palomar || H. E. Holt || JUN || align=right | 7.2 km || 
|-id=691 bgcolor=#d6d6d6
| 24691 ||  || — || September 14, 1990 || Palomar || H. E. Holt || EOS || align=right | 12 km || 
|-id=692 bgcolor=#E9E9E9
| 24692 ||  || — || September 13, 1990 || La Silla || H. Debehogne || — || align=right | 2.7 km || 
|-id=693 bgcolor=#FA8072
| 24693 ||  || — || September 23, 1990 || Palomar || B. Roman || — || align=right | 4.9 km || 
|-id=694 bgcolor=#E9E9E9
| 24694 ||  || — || September 18, 1990 || Palomar || H. E. Holt || EUN || align=right | 5.9 km || 
|-id=695 bgcolor=#E9E9E9
| 24695 Štyrský ||  ||  || September 16, 1990 || Kleť || A. Mrkos || — || align=right | 2.8 km || 
|-id=696 bgcolor=#E9E9E9
| 24696 ||  || — || September 22, 1990 || La Silla || E. W. Elst || — || align=right | 3.0 km || 
|-id=697 bgcolor=#E9E9E9
| 24697 Rastrelli ||  ||  || September 24, 1990 || Nauchnij || G. R. Kastelʹ, L. V. Zhuravleva || — || align=right | 4.1 km || 
|-id=698 bgcolor=#E9E9E9
| 24698 ||  || — || October 9, 1990 || Siding Spring || R. H. McNaught || — || align=right | 5.5 km || 
|-id=699 bgcolor=#fefefe
| 24699 Schwekendiek ||  ||  || October 13, 1990 || Tautenburg Observatory || L. D. Schmadel, F. Börngen || — || align=right | 1.7 km || 
|-id=700 bgcolor=#E9E9E9
| 24700 ||  || — || November 15, 1990 || La Silla || E. W. Elst || MAR || align=right | 4.8 km || 
|}

24701–24800 

|-bgcolor=#d6d6d6
| 24701 Elyu-Ene ||  ||  || November 15, 1990 || La Silla || E. W. Elst || 3:2 || align=right | 18 km || 
|-id=702 bgcolor=#fefefe
| 24702 || 1991 OR || — || July 18, 1991 || Palomar || H. E. Holt || H || align=right | 1.8 km || 
|-id=703 bgcolor=#d6d6d6
| 24703 || 1991 PA || — || August 3, 1991 || Kiyosato || S. Otomo || — || align=right | 8.4 km || 
|-id=704 bgcolor=#fefefe
| 24704 ||  || — || August 3, 1991 || La Silla || E. W. Elst || FLO || align=right | 2.6 km || 
|-id=705 bgcolor=#d6d6d6
| 24705 ||  || — || August 3, 1991 || La Silla || E. W. Elst || — || align=right | 7.7 km || 
|-id=706 bgcolor=#fefefe
| 24706 ||  || — || August 3, 1991 || La Silla || E. W. Elst || FLO || align=right | 2.2 km || 
|-id=707 bgcolor=#fefefe
| 24707 ||  || — || August 3, 1991 || La Silla || E. W. Elst || NYS || align=right | 1.9 km || 
|-id=708 bgcolor=#fefefe
| 24708 ||  || — || August 6, 1991 || La Silla || E. W. Elst || — || align=right | 2.8 km || 
|-id=709 bgcolor=#d6d6d6
| 24709 Mitau ||  ||  || August 6, 1991 || La Silla || E. W. Elst || — || align=right | 9.1 km || 
|-id=710 bgcolor=#fefefe
| 24710 ||  || — || August 6, 1991 || Palomar || H. E. Holt || V || align=right | 2.4 km || 
|-id=711 bgcolor=#fefefe
| 24711 Chamisso ||  ||  || August 6, 1991 || Tautenburg Observatory || F. Börngen || — || align=right | 2.8 km || 
|-id=712 bgcolor=#fefefe
| 24712 Boltzmann ||  ||  || September 12, 1991 || Tautenburg Observatory || F. Börngen, L. D. Schmadel || — || align=right | 2.3 km || 
|-id=713 bgcolor=#fefefe
| 24713 Ekrutt ||  ||  || September 12, 1991 || Tautenburg Observatory || L. D. Schmadel, F. Börngen || — || align=right | 4.9 km || 
|-id=714 bgcolor=#fefefe
| 24714 ||  || — || September 10, 1991 || Palomar || H. E. Holt || NYS || align=right | 2.6 km || 
|-id=715 bgcolor=#d6d6d6
| 24715 ||  || — || September 15, 1991 || Palomar || H. E. Holt || THM || align=right | 8.9 km || 
|-id=716 bgcolor=#E9E9E9
| 24716 ||  || — || September 14, 1991 || Palomar || H. E. Holt || — || align=right | 8.4 km || 
|-id=717 bgcolor=#fefefe
| 24717 || 1991 SA || — || September 16, 1991 || Kiyosato || S. Otomo || — || align=right | 5.6 km || 
|-id=718 bgcolor=#d6d6d6
| 24718 || 1991 SW || — || September 30, 1991 || Siding Spring || R. H. McNaught || VER || align=right | 11 km || 
|-id=719 bgcolor=#fefefe
| 24719 ||  || — || September 30, 1991 || Siding Spring || R. H. McNaught || V || align=right | 2.2 km || 
|-id=720 bgcolor=#fefefe
| 24720 ||  || — || September 16, 1991 || Palomar || H. E. Holt || V || align=right | 2.9 km || 
|-id=721 bgcolor=#fefefe
| 24721 || 1991 TJ || — || October 1, 1991 || Siding Spring || R. H. McNaught || — || align=right | 3.0 km || 
|-id=722 bgcolor=#fefefe
| 24722 || 1991 TK || — || October 1, 1991 || Siding Spring || R. H. McNaught || — || align=right | 4.5 km || 
|-id=723 bgcolor=#fefefe
| 24723 ||  || — || October 1, 1991 || Kitt Peak || Spacewatch || ERI || align=right | 4.4 km || 
|-id=724 bgcolor=#E9E9E9
| 24724 || 1991 UN || — || October 18, 1991 || Kushiro || S. Ueda, H. Kaneda || — || align=right | 2.2 km || 
|-id=725 bgcolor=#E9E9E9
| 24725 ||  || — || October 31, 1991 || Kushiro || S. Ueda, H. Kaneda || — || align=right | 4.8 km || 
|-id=726 bgcolor=#fefefe
| 24726 Nagatatetsuya || 1991 VY ||  || November 2, 1991 || Kitami || A. Takahashi, K. Watanabe || SUL || align=right | 7.8 km || 
|-id=727 bgcolor=#E9E9E9
| 24727 ||  || — || November 4, 1991 || Kushiro || S. Ueda, H. Kaneda || — || align=right | 5.3 km || 
|-id=728 bgcolor=#fefefe
| 24728 Scagell ||  ||  || November 11, 1991 || Stakenbridge || B. G. W. Manning || — || align=right | 3.8 km || 
|-id=729 bgcolor=#E9E9E9
| 24729 ||  || — || November 13, 1991 || Kiyosato || S. Otomo || — || align=right | 3.3 km || 
|-id=730 bgcolor=#fefefe
| 24730 ||  || — || November 5, 1991 || Kiyosato || S. Otomo || FLO || align=right | 3.1 km || 
|-id=731 bgcolor=#fefefe
| 24731 ||  || — || November 4, 1991 || Kitt Peak || Spacewatch || V || align=right | 1.8 km || 
|-id=732 bgcolor=#E9E9E9
| 24732 Leonardcohen ||  ||  || February 2, 1992 || La Silla || E. W. Elst || — || align=right | 3.5 km || 
|-id=733 bgcolor=#E9E9E9
| 24733 ||  || — || February 29, 1992 || La Silla || UESAC || — || align=right | 2.5 km || 
|-id=734 bgcolor=#E9E9E9
| 24734 Kareness ||  ||  || March 10, 1992 || Siding Spring || D. I. Steel || — || align=right | 4.4 km || 
|-id=735 bgcolor=#fefefe
| 24735 ||  || — || March 1, 1992 || La Silla || UESAC || V || align=right | 1.7 km || 
|-id=736 bgcolor=#E9E9E9
| 24736 ||  || — || March 2, 1992 || La Silla || UESAC || — || align=right | 5.3 km || 
|-id=737 bgcolor=#E9E9E9
| 24737 ||  || — || March 2, 1992 || La Silla || UESAC || RAF || align=right | 5.4 km || 
|-id=738 bgcolor=#E9E9E9
| 24738 ||  || — || March 2, 1992 || La Silla || UESAC || — || align=right | 3.9 km || 
|-id=739 bgcolor=#E9E9E9
| 24739 ||  || — || March 1, 1992 || La Silla || UESAC || — || align=right | 3.3 km || 
|-id=740 bgcolor=#E9E9E9
| 24740 ||  || — || March 1, 1992 || La Silla || UESAC || — || align=right | 4.2 km || 
|-id=741 bgcolor=#E9E9E9
| 24741 ||  || — || March 3, 1992 || La Silla || UESAC || — || align=right | 3.9 km || 
|-id=742 bgcolor=#E9E9E9
| 24742 ||  || — || April 4, 1992 || La Silla || E. W. Elst || MIS || align=right | 7.7 km || 
|-id=743 bgcolor=#d6d6d6
| 24743 || 1992 NF || — || July 2, 1992 || Palomar || E. F. Helin || EOS || align=right | 11 km || 
|-id=744 bgcolor=#fefefe
| 24744 ||  || — || July 26, 1992 || La Silla || E. W. Elst || — || align=right | 2.1 km || 
|-id=745 bgcolor=#d6d6d6
| 24745 || 1992 QY || — || August 29, 1992 || Palomar || E. F. Helin || AEG || align=right | 10 km || 
|-id=746 bgcolor=#fefefe
| 24746 ||  || — || September 2, 1992 || La Silla || E. W. Elst || — || align=right | 1.9 km || 
|-id=747 bgcolor=#d6d6d6
| 24747 ||  || — || September 2, 1992 || La Silla || E. W. Elst || — || align=right | 6.9 km || 
|-id=748 bgcolor=#d6d6d6
| 24748 Nernst ||  ||  || September 26, 1992 || Tautenburg Observatory || F. Börngen, L. D. Schmadel || — || align=right | 10 km || 
|-id=749 bgcolor=#d6d6d6
| 24749 Grebel ||  ||  || September 24, 1992 || Tautenburg Observatory || L. D. Schmadel, F. Börngen || — || align=right | 18 km || 
|-id=750 bgcolor=#d6d6d6
| 24750 Ohm ||  ||  || September 24, 1992 || Tautenburg Observatory || F. Börngen, L. D. Schmadel || KOR || align=right | 3.7 km || 
|-id=751 bgcolor=#d6d6d6
| 24751 Kroemer ||  ||  || September 21, 1992 || Tautenburg Observatory || F. Börngen || — || align=right | 11 km || 
|-id=752 bgcolor=#d6d6d6
| 24752 || 1992 UN || — || October 19, 1992 || Kushiro || S. Ueda, H. Kaneda || THM || align=right | 11 km || 
|-id=753 bgcolor=#fefefe
| 24753 Fujikake ||  ||  || October 28, 1992 || Kitami || K. Endate, K. Watanabe || — || align=right | 3.4 km || 
|-id=754 bgcolor=#fefefe
| 24754 Zellyfry ||  ||  || October 31, 1992 || Okutama || T. Hioki, S. Hayakawa || FLO || align=right | 5.0 km || 
|-id=755 bgcolor=#fefefe
| 24755 ||  || — || October 28, 1992 || Kushiro || S. Ueda, H. Kaneda || FLO || align=right | 3.1 km || 
|-id=756 bgcolor=#fefefe
| 24756 || 1992 VF || — || November 2, 1992 || Uto || F. Uto || — || align=right | 2.3 km || 
|-id=757 bgcolor=#fefefe
| 24757 || 1992 VN || — || November 1, 1992 || Kitami || M. Yanai, K. Watanabe || — || align=right | 4.9 km || 
|-id=758 bgcolor=#fefefe
| 24758 || 1992 WZ || — || November 17, 1992 || Dynic || A. Sugie || FLO || align=right | 3.1 km || 
|-id=759 bgcolor=#E9E9E9
| 24759 ||  || — || November 18, 1992 || Okutama || T. Hioki, S. Hayakawa || HNS || align=right | 6.3 km || 
|-id=760 bgcolor=#fefefe
| 24760 ||  || — || December 18, 1992 || Caussols || E. W. Elst || FLO || align=right | 2.9 km || 
|-id=761 bgcolor=#FFC2E0
| 24761 Ahau ||  ||  || January 28, 1993 || Palomar || C. S. Shoemaker, E. M. Shoemaker || APO +1km || align=right | 1.2 km || 
|-id=762 bgcolor=#E9E9E9
| 24762 ||  || — || February 25, 1993 || Oizumi || T. Kobayashi || ADE || align=right | 9.4 km || 
|-id=763 bgcolor=#fefefe
| 24763 ||  || — || February 20, 1993 || Caussols || E. W. Elst || V || align=right | 2.1 km || 
|-id=764 bgcolor=#fefefe
| 24764 ||  || — || February 20, 1993 || Caussols || E. W. Elst || V || align=right | 2.7 km || 
|-id=765 bgcolor=#fefefe
| 24765 ||  || — || March 17, 1993 || La Silla || UESAC || — || align=right | 6.9 km || 
|-id=766 bgcolor=#fefefe
| 24766 ||  || — || March 17, 1993 || La Silla || UESAC || NYS || align=right | 2.9 km || 
|-id=767 bgcolor=#fefefe
| 24767 ||  || — || March 17, 1993 || La Silla || UESAC || NYS || align=right | 2.7 km || 
|-id=768 bgcolor=#fefefe
| 24768 ||  || — || March 17, 1993 || La Silla || UESAC || NYS || align=right | 2.7 km || 
|-id=769 bgcolor=#E9E9E9
| 24769 ||  || — || March 21, 1993 || La Silla || UESAC || — || align=right | 2.4 km || 
|-id=770 bgcolor=#fefefe
| 24770 ||  || — || March 21, 1993 || La Silla || UESAC || — || align=right | 2.7 km || 
|-id=771 bgcolor=#fefefe
| 24771 ||  || — || March 19, 1993 || La Silla || UESAC || — || align=right | 3.3 km || 
|-id=772 bgcolor=#fefefe
| 24772 ||  || — || March 19, 1993 || La Silla || UESAC || — || align=right | 3.5 km || 
|-id=773 bgcolor=#fefefe
| 24773 ||  || — || March 19, 1993 || La Silla || UESAC || NYS || align=right | 2.6 km || 
|-id=774 bgcolor=#E9E9E9
| 24774 ||  || — || March 19, 1993 || La Silla || UESAC || — || align=right | 2.4 km || 
|-id=775 bgcolor=#fefefe
| 24775 ||  || — || March 19, 1993 || La Silla || UESAC || NYS || align=right | 2.5 km || 
|-id=776 bgcolor=#E9E9E9
| 24776 ||  || — || March 19, 1993 || La Silla || UESAC || — || align=right | 2.3 km || 
|-id=777 bgcolor=#E9E9E9
| 24777 || 1993 JY || — || May 14, 1993 || La Silla || E. W. Elst || EUN || align=right | 4.1 km || 
|-id=778 bgcolor=#fefefe
| 24778 Nemsu ||  ||  || May 24, 1993 || Palomar || C. S. Shoemaker, D. H. Levy || H || align=right | 1.7 km || 
|-id=779 bgcolor=#E9E9E9
| 24779 Presque Isle ||  ||  || July 23, 1993 || Palomar || C. S. Shoemaker, D. H. Levy || — || align=right | 4.7 km || 
|-id=780 bgcolor=#E9E9E9
| 24780 ||  || — || August 19, 1993 || Palomar || E. F. Helin || — || align=right | 4.4 km || 
|-id=781 bgcolor=#E9E9E9
| 24781 ||  || — || September 12, 1993 || Palomar || PCAS || — || align=right | 6.7 km || 
|-id=782 bgcolor=#fefefe
| 24782 ||  || — || September 17, 1993 || La Silla || E. W. Elst || — || align=right | 1.4 km || 
|-id=783 bgcolor=#E9E9E9
| 24783 ||  || — || September 16, 1993 || La Silla || H. Debehogne, E. W. Elst || AST || align=right | 6.9 km || 
|-id=784 bgcolor=#E9E9E9
| 24784 ||  || — || October 13, 1993 || Palomar || H. E. Holt || GEF || align=right | 4.9 km || 
|-id=785 bgcolor=#d6d6d6
| 24785 ||  || — || October 9, 1993 || La Silla || E. W. Elst || — || align=right | 7.9 km || 
|-id=786 bgcolor=#d6d6d6
| 24786 ||  || — || October 9, 1993 || La Silla || E. W. Elst || — || align=right | 7.2 km || 
|-id=787 bgcolor=#d6d6d6
| 24787 ||  || — || October 9, 1993 || La Silla || E. W. Elst || EOS || align=right | 4.8 km || 
|-id=788 bgcolor=#d6d6d6
| 24788 ||  || — || October 9, 1993 || La Silla || E. W. Elst || — || align=right | 5.7 km || 
|-id=789 bgcolor=#d6d6d6
| 24789 ||  || — || October 9, 1993 || La Silla || E. W. Elst || KOR || align=right | 3.7 km || 
|-id=790 bgcolor=#d6d6d6
| 24790 ||  || — || October 9, 1993 || La Silla || E. W. Elst || KOR || align=right | 4.8 km || 
|-id=791 bgcolor=#d6d6d6
| 24791 ||  || — || October 9, 1993 || La Silla || E. W. Elst || — || align=right | 5.1 km || 
|-id=792 bgcolor=#d6d6d6
| 24792 ||  || — || October 10, 1993 || La Silla || H. Debehogne || THM || align=right | 5.0 km || 
|-id=793 bgcolor=#E9E9E9
| 24793 || 1993 UT || — || October 22, 1993 || Oohira || T. Urata || PAL || align=right | 6.1 km || 
|-id=794 bgcolor=#d6d6d6
| 24794 Kurland ||  ||  || October 20, 1993 || La Silla || E. W. Elst || ALA || align=right | 14 km || 
|-id=795 bgcolor=#E9E9E9
| 24795 ||  || — || January 5, 1994 || Kushiro || S. Ueda, H. Kaneda || — || align=right | 5.1 km || 
|-id=796 bgcolor=#fefefe
| 24796 ||  || — || February 8, 1994 || La Silla || E. W. Elst || — || align=right | 2.3 km || 
|-id=797 bgcolor=#E9E9E9
| 24797 ||  || — || August 9, 1994 || Palomar || PCAS || — || align=right | 4.7 km || 
|-id=798 bgcolor=#fefefe
| 24798 ||  || — || August 9, 1994 || Palomar || PCAS || — || align=right | 2.2 km || 
|-id=799 bgcolor=#fefefe
| 24799 ||  || — || August 10, 1994 || La Silla || E. W. Elst || — || align=right | 1.5 km || 
|-id=800 bgcolor=#E9E9E9
| 24800 ||  || — || August 10, 1994 || La Silla || E. W. Elst || — || align=right | 2.0 km || 
|}

24801–24900 

|-bgcolor=#fefefe
| 24801 ||  || — || August 10, 1994 || La Silla || E. W. Elst || — || align=right | 3.7 km || 
|-id=802 bgcolor=#fefefe
| 24802 ||  || — || August 10, 1994 || La Silla || E. W. Elst || — || align=right | 5.3 km || 
|-id=803 bgcolor=#fefefe
| 24803 ||  || — || August 12, 1994 || La Silla || E. W. Elst || — || align=right | 2.1 km || 
|-id=804 bgcolor=#fefefe
| 24804 ||  || — || August 12, 1994 || La Silla || E. W. Elst || — || align=right | 2.2 km || 
|-id=805 bgcolor=#E9E9E9
| 24805 ||  || — || September 4, 1994 || Oizumi || T. Kobayashi || — || align=right | 3.9 km || 
|-id=806 bgcolor=#FA8072
| 24806 ||  || — || September 12, 1994 || Kitt Peak || Spacewatch || — || align=right | 3.0 km || 
|-id=807 bgcolor=#E9E9E9
| 24807 ||  || — || September 28, 1994 || Kitt Peak || Spacewatch || — || align=right | 4.5 km || 
|-id=808 bgcolor=#d6d6d6
| 24808 ||  || — || October 2, 1994 || Kitami || K. Endate, K. Watanabe || — || align=right | 10 km || 
|-id=809 bgcolor=#FA8072
| 24809 ||  || — || October 8, 1994 || Palomar || E. F. Helin || H || align=right | 3.1 km || 
|-id=810 bgcolor=#E9E9E9
| 24810 ||  || — || October 28, 1994 || Kitt Peak || Spacewatch || — || align=right | 5.3 km || 
|-id=811 bgcolor=#E9E9E9
| 24811 || 1994 VB || — || November 1, 1994 || Oizumi || T. Kobayashi || EUN || align=right | 3.7 km || 
|-id=812 bgcolor=#E9E9E9
| 24812 || 1994 VH || — || November 1, 1994 || Oizumi || T. Kobayashi || — || align=right | 3.2 km || 
|-id=813 bgcolor=#E9E9E9
| 24813 ||  || — || November 4, 1994 || Oizumi || T. Kobayashi || ADE || align=right | 6.7 km || 
|-id=814 bgcolor=#FA8072
| 24814 ||  || — || November 10, 1994 || Siding Spring || G. J. Garradd || — || align=right | 2.8 km || 
|-id=815 bgcolor=#fefefe
| 24815 ||  || — || November 7, 1994 || Kushiro || S. Ueda, H. Kaneda || H || align=right | 1.4 km || 
|-id=816 bgcolor=#E9E9E9
| 24816 ||  || — || November 1, 1994 || Kitami || K. Endate, K. Watanabe || — || align=right | 4.5 km || 
|-id=817 bgcolor=#E9E9E9
| 24817 || 1994 WJ || — || November 25, 1994 || Oizumi || T. Kobayashi || — || align=right | 3.4 km || 
|-id=818 bgcolor=#d6d6d6
| 24818 Menichelli || 1994 WX ||  || November 23, 1994 || San Marcello || L. Tesi, A. Boattini || HYG || align=right | 4.9 km || 
|-id=819 bgcolor=#FA8072
| 24819 ||  || — || December 6, 1994 || Siding Spring || R. H. McNaught || H || align=right | 3.0 km || 
|-id=820 bgcolor=#E9E9E9
| 24820 ||  || — || December 31, 1994 || Oizumi || T. Kobayashi || — || align=right | 9.2 km || 
|-id=821 bgcolor=#d6d6d6
| 24821 ||  || — || January 29, 1995 || Kitt Peak || Spacewatch || — || align=right | 7.0 km || 
|-id=822 bgcolor=#d6d6d6
| 24822 ||  || — || January 29, 1995 || Kitt Peak || Spacewatch || — || align=right | 12 km || 
|-id=823 bgcolor=#d6d6d6
| 24823 ||  || — || February 25, 1995 || Kitt Peak || Spacewatch || — || align=right | 5.8 km || 
|-id=824 bgcolor=#d6d6d6
| 24824 ||  || — || April 4, 1995 || Xinglong || SCAP || — || align=right | 6.8 km || 
|-id=825 bgcolor=#fefefe
| 24825 ||  || — || August 21, 1995 || Kitami || K. Endate, K. Watanabe || FLO || align=right | 4.0 km || 
|-id=826 bgcolor=#fefefe
| 24826 Pascoli ||  ||  || August 22, 1995 || Colleverde || V. S. Casulli || V || align=right | 2.0 km || 
|-id=827 bgcolor=#fefefe
| 24827 Maryphil || 1995 RA ||  || September 2, 1995 || Catalina Station || T. B. Spahr || PHO || align=right | 5.9 km || 
|-id=828 bgcolor=#fefefe
| 24828 ||  || — || September 20, 1995 || Church Stretton || S. P. Laurie || FLO || align=right | 2.3 km || 
|-id=829 bgcolor=#fefefe
| 24829 Berounurbi ||  ||  || September 22, 1995 || Ondřejov || L. Kotková || V || align=right | 1.4 km || 
|-id=830 bgcolor=#fefefe
| 24830 ||  || — || September 20, 1995 || Kitami || K. Endate, K. Watanabe || FLO || align=right | 2.6 km || 
|-id=831 bgcolor=#fefefe
| 24831 ||  || — || September 21, 1995 || Kushiro || S. Ueda, H. Kaneda || — || align=right | 2.9 km || 
|-id=832 bgcolor=#fefefe
| 24832 ||  || — || September 25, 1995 || Xinglong || SCAP || — || align=right | 2.6 km || 
|-id=833 bgcolor=#fefefe
| 24833 ||  || — || September 19, 1995 || Kitt Peak || Spacewatch || V || align=right | 1.8 km || 
|-id=834 bgcolor=#fefefe
| 24834 ||  || — || September 20, 1995 || Kitt Peak || Spacewatch || V || align=right | 1.5 km || 
|-id=835 bgcolor=#C2E0FF
| 24835 ||  || — || September 19, 1995 || Steward Observatory || N. Danzl || Haumea || align=right | 518 km || 
|-id=836 bgcolor=#E9E9E9
| 24836 ||  || — || October 14, 1995 || Xinglong || SCAP || — || align=right | 2.5 km || 
|-id=837 bgcolor=#fefefe
| 24837 Mšecké Žehrovice ||  ||  || October 22, 1995 || Kleť || M. Tichý || ERI || align=right | 5.5 km || 
|-id=838 bgcolor=#fefefe
| 24838 Abilunon ||  ||  || October 23, 1995 || Kleť || M. Tichý || — || align=right | 3.0 km || 
|-id=839 bgcolor=#fefefe
| 24839 ||  || — || October 20, 1995 || Oizumi || T. Kobayashi || V || align=right | 2.7 km || 
|-id=840 bgcolor=#fefefe
| 24840 ||  || — || October 27, 1995 || Oizumi || T. Kobayashi || FLO || align=right | 2.6 km || 
|-id=841 bgcolor=#fefefe
| 24841 ||  || — || October 30, 1995 || Kitami || K. Endate, K. Watanabe || — || align=right | 6.3 km || 
|-id=842 bgcolor=#fefefe
| 24842 ||  || — || October 20, 1995 || Caussols || E. W. Elst || — || align=right | 2.7 km || 
|-id=843 bgcolor=#fefefe
| 24843 || 1995 VZ || — || November 15, 1995 || Oizumi || T. Kobayashi || NYS || align=right | 2.3 km || 
|-id=844 bgcolor=#fefefe
| 24844 ||  || — || November 15, 1995 || Kitami || K. Endate, K. Watanabe || FLO || align=right | 5.2 km || 
|-id=845 bgcolor=#fefefe
| 24845 ||  || — || November 15, 1995 || Kitt Peak || Spacewatch || — || align=right | 2.0 km || 
|-id=846 bgcolor=#fefefe
| 24846 || 1995 WM || — || November 16, 1995 || Oizumi || T. Kobayashi || V || align=right | 3.1 km || 
|-id=847 bgcolor=#fefefe
| 24847 Polesný ||  ||  || November 26, 1995 || Kleť || Kleť Obs. || NYS || align=right | 2.6 km || 
|-id=848 bgcolor=#E9E9E9
| 24848 ||  || — || November 28, 1995 || Kitt Peak || Spacewatch || — || align=right | 4.3 km || 
|-id=849 bgcolor=#fefefe
| 24849 ||  || — || November 16, 1995 || Kushiro || S. Ueda, H. Kaneda || — || align=right | 2.3 km || 
|-id=850 bgcolor=#fefefe
| 24850 Biagiomarin || 1995 XA ||  || December 1, 1995 || Farra d'Isonzo || Farra d'Isonzo || V || align=right | 1.9 km || 
|-id=851 bgcolor=#E9E9E9
| 24851 || 1995 XE || — || December 2, 1995 || Oizumi || T. Kobayashi || MAR || align=right | 7.1 km || 
|-id=852 bgcolor=#fefefe
| 24852 ||  || — || December 14, 1995 || Kitt Peak || Spacewatch || — || align=right | 2.5 km || 
|-id=853 bgcolor=#E9E9E9
| 24853 || 1995 YJ || — || December 17, 1995 || Oizumi || T. Kobayashi || — || align=right | 4.9 km || 
|-id=854 bgcolor=#fefefe
| 24854 || 1995 YU || — || December 19, 1995 || Oizumi || T. Kobayashi || — || align=right | 3.1 km || 
|-id=855 bgcolor=#E9E9E9
| 24855 ||  || — || December 22, 1995 || Nachi-Katsuura || Y. Shimizu, T. Urata || — || align=right | 3.6 km || 
|-id=856 bgcolor=#E9E9E9
| 24856 Messidoro ||  ||  || January 15, 1996 || Cima Ekar || M. Tombelli, C. Casacci || CLO || align=right | 4.5 km || 
|-id=857 bgcolor=#fefefe
| 24857 Sperello ||  ||  || January 15, 1996 || Cima Ekar || U. Munari, M. Tombelli || — || align=right | 1.6 km || 
|-id=858 bgcolor=#E9E9E9
| 24858 Diethelm ||  ||  || January 21, 1996 || Ondřejov || M. Wolf, P. Pravec || — || align=right | 2.7 km || 
|-id=859 bgcolor=#E9E9E9
| 24859 ||  || — || January 24, 1996 || Kitt Peak || Spacewatch || — || align=right | 8.3 km || 
|-id=860 bgcolor=#E9E9E9
| 24860 ||  || — || February 11, 1996 || Oizumi || T. Kobayashi || — || align=right | 4.9 km || 
|-id=861 bgcolor=#E9E9E9
| 24861 ||  || — || February 22, 1996 || Sormano || A. Testa, P. Ghezzi || — || align=right | 3.3 km || 
|-id=862 bgcolor=#E9E9E9
| 24862 Hromec ||  ||  || February 27, 1996 || Modra || P. Kolény, L. Kornoš || — || align=right | 4.4 km || 
|-id=863 bgcolor=#E9E9E9
| 24863 Cheli || 1996 EB ||  || March 2, 1996 || Farra d'Isonzo || Farra d'Isonzo || EUN || align=right | 5.1 km || 
|-id=864 bgcolor=#E9E9E9
| 24864 ||  || — || March 15, 1996 || Haleakala || NEAT || AGN || align=right | 4.1 km || 
|-id=865 bgcolor=#d6d6d6
| 24865 ||  || — || March 15, 1996 || Haleakala || NEAT || — || align=right | 5.6 km || 
|-id=866 bgcolor=#d6d6d6
| 24866 ||  || — || March 15, 1996 || Haleakala || NEAT || ALA || align=right | 20 km || 
|-id=867 bgcolor=#d6d6d6
| 24867 ||  || — || March 11, 1996 || Kitt Peak || Spacewatch || — || align=right | 5.2 km || 
|-id=868 bgcolor=#E9E9E9
| 24868 ||  || — || March 11, 1996 || Kitt Peak || Spacewatch || — || align=right | 6.0 km || 
|-id=869 bgcolor=#E9E9E9
| 24869 || 1996 FZ || — || March 18, 1996 || Haleakala || NEAT || HEN || align=right | 3.5 km || 
|-id=870 bgcolor=#E9E9E9
| 24870 ||  || — || March 19, 1996 || Haleakala || NEAT || — || align=right | 6.6 km || 
|-id=871 bgcolor=#d6d6d6
| 24871 ||  || — || April 15, 1996 || La Silla || E. W. Elst || — || align=right | 6.8 km || 
|-id=872 bgcolor=#d6d6d6
| 24872 ||  || — || April 15, 1996 || La Silla || E. W. Elst || EOS || align=right | 6.6 km || 
|-id=873 bgcolor=#d6d6d6
| 24873 ||  || — || April 15, 1996 || La Silla || E. W. Elst || — || align=right | 5.2 km || 
|-id=874 bgcolor=#d6d6d6
| 24874 ||  || — || April 17, 1996 || La Silla || E. W. Elst || KOR || align=right | 4.6 km || 
|-id=875 bgcolor=#d6d6d6
| 24875 ||  || — || April 18, 1996 || La Silla || E. W. Elst || KOR || align=right | 4.4 km || 
|-id=876 bgcolor=#d6d6d6
| 24876 ||  || — || April 18, 1996 || La Silla || E. W. Elst || — || align=right | 8.1 km || 
|-id=877 bgcolor=#d6d6d6
| 24877 ||  || — || April 18, 1996 || La Silla || E. W. Elst || THM || align=right | 6.1 km || 
|-id=878 bgcolor=#d6d6d6
| 24878 ||  || — || April 20, 1996 || La Silla || E. W. Elst || TIR || align=right | 9.7 km || 
|-id=879 bgcolor=#d6d6d6
| 24879 ||  || — || May 21, 1996 || Haleakala || NEAT || SAN || align=right | 6.1 km || 
|-id=880 bgcolor=#d6d6d6
| 24880 || 1996 OP || — || July 21, 1996 || Haleakala || NEAT || THM || align=right | 7.3 km || 
|-id=881 bgcolor=#fefefe
| 24881 ||  || — || August 10, 1996 || Haleakala || NEAT || H || align=right | 1.6 km || 
|-id=882 bgcolor=#C2FFFF
| 24882 ||  || — || September 13, 1996 || La Silla || UDTS || L4 || align=right | 19 km || 
|-id=883 bgcolor=#FA8072
| 24883 ||  || — || November 13, 1996 || Xinglong || SCAP || H || align=right | 2.3 km || 
|-id=884 bgcolor=#E9E9E9
| 24884 ||  || — || December 7, 1996 || Oizumi || T. Kobayashi || EUN || align=right | 4.4 km || 
|-id=885 bgcolor=#fefefe
| 24885 ||  || — || December 7, 1996 || Oizumi || T. Kobayashi || — || align=right | 2.6 km || 
|-id=886 bgcolor=#fefefe
| 24886 ||  || — || December 4, 1996 || Kitt Peak || Spacewatch || NYS || align=right | 1.8 km || 
|-id=887 bgcolor=#fefefe
| 24887 ||  || — || December 11, 1996 || Oizumi || T. Kobayashi || — || align=right | 2.1 km || 
|-id=888 bgcolor=#fefefe
| 24888 ||  || — || December 8, 1996 || Catalina Station || C. W. Hergenrother || — || align=right | 3.2 km || 
|-id=889 bgcolor=#fefefe
| 24889 Tamurahosinomura ||  ||  || December 11, 1996 || Geisei || T. Seki || — || align=right | 2.7 km || 
|-id=890 bgcolor=#d6d6d6
| 24890 Amaliafinzi ||  ||  || December 4, 1996 || Cima Ekar || M. Tombelli, C. Casacci || — || align=right | 8.2 km || 
|-id=891 bgcolor=#fefefe
| 24891 ||  || — || January 4, 1997 || Oizumi || T. Kobayashi || — || align=right | 2.4 km || 
|-id=892 bgcolor=#fefefe
| 24892 ||  || — || January 4, 1997 || Oizumi || T. Kobayashi || FLO || align=right | 2.0 km || 
|-id=893 bgcolor=#fefefe
| 24893 ||  || — || January 7, 1997 || Oizumi || T. Kobayashi || V || align=right | 2.0 km || 
|-id=894 bgcolor=#fefefe
| 24894 ||  || — || January 2, 1997 || Kitt Peak || Spacewatch || FLO || align=right | 3.3 km || 
|-id=895 bgcolor=#fefefe
| 24895 ||  || — || January 9, 1997 || Nachi-Katsuura || Y. Shimizu, T. Urata || — || align=right | 3.1 km || 
|-id=896 bgcolor=#fefefe
| 24896 ||  || — || January 12, 1997 || Haleakala || NEAT || — || align=right | 2.4 km || 
|-id=897 bgcolor=#fefefe
| 24897 ||  || — || January 13, 1997 || Haleakala || NEAT || — || align=right | 2.3 km || 
|-id=898 bgcolor=#fefefe
| 24898 Alanholmes ||  ||  || January 14, 1997 || Farra d'Isonzo || Farra d'Isonzo || NYS || align=right | 2.1 km || 
|-id=899 bgcolor=#fefefe
| 24899 Dominiona ||  ||  || January 14, 1997 || NRC-DAO || G. C. L. Aikman || — || align=right | 2.1 km || 
|-id=900 bgcolor=#fefefe
| 24900 ||  || — || January 15, 1997 || Oizumi || T. Kobayashi || NYS || align=right | 3.5 km || 
|}

24901–25000 

|-bgcolor=#fefefe
| 24901 ||  || — || January 11, 1997 || Kitt Peak || Spacewatch || — || align=right | 2.3 km || 
|-id=902 bgcolor=#fefefe
| 24902 ||  || — || January 11, 1997 || Xinglong || SCAP || — || align=right | 3.1 km || 
|-id=903 bgcolor=#fefefe
| 24903 ||  || — || January 11, 1997 || Xinglong || SCAP || V || align=right | 3.8 km || 
|-id=904 bgcolor=#fefefe
| 24904 ||  || — || January 31, 1997 || Kitt Peak || Spacewatch || — || align=right | 2.6 km || 
|-id=905 bgcolor=#fefefe
| 24905 ||  || — || February 1, 1997 || Oizumi || T. Kobayashi || NYS || align=right | 2.8 km || 
|-id=906 bgcolor=#fefefe
| 24906 ||  || — || February 4, 1997 || Haleakala || NEAT || V || align=right | 2.4 km || 
|-id=907 bgcolor=#fefefe
| 24907 Alfredhaar ||  ||  || February 4, 1997 || Prescott || P. G. Comba || SUL || align=right | 5.0 km || 
|-id=908 bgcolor=#fefefe
| 24908 ||  || — || February 13, 1997 || Oizumi || T. Kobayashi || — || align=right | 3.4 km || 
|-id=909 bgcolor=#fefefe
| 24909 ||  || — || February 7, 1997 || Xinglong || SCAP || V || align=right | 2.7 km || 
|-id=910 bgcolor=#fefefe
| 24910 Haruoando ||  ||  || February 14, 1997 || Nanyo || T. Okuni || — || align=right | 2.9 km || 
|-id=911 bgcolor=#fefefe
| 24911 Kojimashigemi || 1997 DU ||  || February 27, 1997 || Kitami || K. Endate, K. Watanabe || V || align=right | 2.3 km || 
|-id=912 bgcolor=#fefefe
| 24912 ||  || — || March 3, 1997 || Kitt Peak || Spacewatch || V || align=right | 2.0 km || 
|-id=913 bgcolor=#fefefe
| 24913 ||  || — || March 4, 1997 || Oizumi || T. Kobayashi || — || align=right | 2.9 km || 
|-id=914 bgcolor=#fefefe
| 24914 ||  || — || March 4, 1997 || Oizumi || T. Kobayashi || V || align=right | 2.2 km || 
|-id=915 bgcolor=#fefefe
| 24915 ||  || — || March 7, 1997 || Oizumi || T. Kobayashi || NYS || align=right | 5.0 km || 
|-id=916 bgcolor=#fefefe
| 24916 Stelzhamer ||  ||  || March 7, 1997 || Davidschlag || E. Meyer || NYS || align=right | 1.5 km || 
|-id=917 bgcolor=#fefefe
| 24917 ||  || — || March 3, 1997 || Kitt Peak || Spacewatch || V || align=right | 1.9 km || 
|-id=918 bgcolor=#fefefe
| 24918 Tedkooser ||  ||  || March 10, 1997 || Lime Creek || R. Linderholm || — || align=right | 3.0 km || 
|-id=919 bgcolor=#fefefe
| 24919 Teruyoshi ||  ||  || March 3, 1997 || Kitami || K. Endate, K. Watanabe || NYS || align=right | 2.0 km || 
|-id=920 bgcolor=#fefefe
| 24920 ||  || — || March 2, 1997 || Xinglong || SCAP || V || align=right | 3.1 km || 
|-id=921 bgcolor=#fefefe
| 24921 ||  || — || March 11, 1997 || Kitt Peak || Spacewatch || NYS || align=right | 2.1 km || 
|-id=922 bgcolor=#fefefe
| 24922 Bechtel ||  ||  || March 4, 1997 || Socorro || LINEAR || — || align=right | 3.8 km || 
|-id=923 bgcolor=#fefefe
| 24923 Claralouisa ||  ||  || March 5, 1997 || Socorro || LINEAR || FLO || align=right | 2.1 km || 
|-id=924 bgcolor=#fefefe
| 24924 ||  || — || March 15, 1997 || Xinglong || SCAP || NYS || align=right | 2.6 km || 
|-id=925 bgcolor=#fefefe
| 24925 || 1997 FW || — || March 18, 1997 || Xinglong || SCAP || — || align=right | 3.0 km || 
|-id=926 bgcolor=#E9E9E9
| 24926 Jinpan ||  ||  || April 2, 1997 || Socorro || LINEAR || — || align=right | 3.5 km || 
|-id=927 bgcolor=#fefefe
| 24927 Brianpalmer ||  ||  || April 3, 1997 || Socorro || LINEAR || NYS || align=right | 3.0 km || 
|-id=928 bgcolor=#fefefe
| 24928 Susanbehel ||  ||  || April 3, 1997 || Socorro || LINEAR || — || align=right | 3.1 km || 
|-id=929 bgcolor=#fefefe
| 24929 ||  || — || April 3, 1997 || Socorro || LINEAR || — || align=right | 2.3 km || 
|-id=930 bgcolor=#fefefe
| 24930 Annajamison ||  ||  || April 3, 1997 || Socorro || LINEAR || NYS || align=right | 2.9 km || 
|-id=931 bgcolor=#E9E9E9
| 24931 Noeth ||  ||  || April 3, 1997 || Socorro || LINEAR || — || align=right | 2.3 km || 
|-id=932 bgcolor=#E9E9E9
| 24932 ||  || — || April 6, 1997 || Socorro || LINEAR || — || align=right | 2.9 km || 
|-id=933 bgcolor=#fefefe
| 24933 ||  || — || April 8, 1997 || Kitt Peak || Spacewatch || NYS || align=right | 2.5 km || 
|-id=934 bgcolor=#E9E9E9
| 24934 Natecovert ||  ||  || April 6, 1997 || Socorro || LINEAR || EUN || align=right | 5.4 km || 
|-id=935 bgcolor=#E9E9E9
| 24935 Godfreyhardy ||  ||  || April 28, 1997 || Prescott || P. G. Comba || — || align=right | 2.6 km || 
|-id=936 bgcolor=#E9E9E9
| 24936 ||  || — || April 30, 1997 || Socorro || LINEAR || — || align=right | 7.4 km || 
|-id=937 bgcolor=#E9E9E9
| 24937 ||  || — || April 30, 1997 || Socorro || LINEAR || — || align=right | 1.9 km || 
|-id=938 bgcolor=#fefefe
| 24938 ||  || — || April 30, 1997 || Socorro || LINEAR || — || align=right | 4.1 km || 
|-id=939 bgcolor=#fefefe
| 24939 Chiminello || 1997 JR ||  || May 1, 1997 || Bologna || San Vittore Obs. || — || align=right | 5.1 km || 
|-id=940 bgcolor=#E9E9E9
| 24940 Sankichiyama ||  ||  || May 1, 1997 || Nanyo || T. Okuni || — || align=right | 4.5 km || 
|-id=941 bgcolor=#fefefe
| 24941 ||  || — || May 3, 1997 || La Silla || E. W. Elst || — || align=right | 2.7 km || 
|-id=942 bgcolor=#E9E9E9
| 24942 ||  || — || May 3, 1997 || La Silla || E. W. Elst || — || align=right | 2.8 km || 
|-id=943 bgcolor=#E9E9E9
| 24943 ||  || — || May 3, 1997 || La Silla || E. W. Elst || — || align=right | 3.1 km || 
|-id=944 bgcolor=#E9E9E9
| 24944 Harish-Chandra ||  ||  || June 11, 1997 || Prescott || P. G. Comba || — || align=right | 4.7 km || 
|-id=945 bgcolor=#E9E9E9
| 24945 Houziaux ||  ||  || June 7, 1997 || La Silla || E. W. Elst || — || align=right | 2.3 km || 
|-id=946 bgcolor=#E9E9E9
| 24946 Foscolo || 1997 NQ ||  || July 1, 1997 || Colleverde || V. S. Casulli || EUN || align=right | 5.4 km || 
|-id=947 bgcolor=#d6d6d6
| 24947 Hausdorff ||  ||  || July 7, 1997 || Prescott || P. G. Comba || KOR || align=right | 6.1 km || 
|-id=948 bgcolor=#E9E9E9
| 24948 Babote ||  ||  || July 9, 1997 || Pises || Pises Obs. || GEF || align=right | 4.2 km || 
|-id=949 bgcolor=#d6d6d6
| 24949 Klačka ||  ||  || August 4, 1997 || Modra || A. Galád, A. Pravda || — || align=right | 7.3 km || 
|-id=950 bgcolor=#d6d6d6
| 24950 Nikhilas || 1997 QF ||  || August 23, 1997 || Kleť || Z. Moravec || — || align=right | 6.6 km || 
|-id=951 bgcolor=#d6d6d6
| 24951 || 1997 QK || — || August 24, 1997 || Kleť || Z. Moravec || — || align=right | 6.5 km || 
|-id=952 bgcolor=#C2E0FF
| 24952 ||  || — || August 28, 1997 || Mauna Kea || J. X. Luu, C. Trujillo, D. C. Jewitt, K. Berney || plutino || align=right | 135 km || 
|-id=953 bgcolor=#d6d6d6
| 24953 ||  || — || September 23, 1997 || Kitt Peak || Spacewatch || THM || align=right | 7.7 km || 
|-id=954 bgcolor=#d6d6d6
| 24954 ||  || — || September 23, 1997 || Kitt Peak || Spacewatch || — || align=right | 6.0 km || 
|-id=955 bgcolor=#d6d6d6
| 24955 ||  || — || September 26, 1997 || Xinglong || SCAP || — || align=right | 7.2 km || 
|-id=956 bgcolor=#d6d6d6
| 24956 Qiannan ||  ||  || September 26, 1997 || Xinglong || SCAP || HYG || align=right | 8.8 km || 
|-id=957 bgcolor=#d6d6d6
| 24957 ||  || — || September 27, 1997 || Uenohara || N. Kawasato || — || align=right | 8.1 km || 
|-id=958 bgcolor=#d6d6d6
| 24958 ||  || — || September 28, 1997 || Woomera || F. B. Zoltowski || HYG || align=right | 12 km || 
|-id=959 bgcolor=#d6d6d6
| 24959 Zielenbach || 1997 TR ||  || October 3, 1997 || Modra || A. Galád, A. Pravda || — || align=right | 7.2 km || 
|-id=960 bgcolor=#d6d6d6
| 24960 ||  || — || October 6, 1997 || Kitami || K. Endate, K. Watanabe || — || align=right | 12 km || 
|-id=961 bgcolor=#d6d6d6
| 24961 ||  || — || October 8, 1997 || Xinglong || SCAP || — || align=right | 8.5 km || 
|-id=962 bgcolor=#d6d6d6
| 24962 Kenjitoba ||  ||  || October 27, 1997 || Kuma Kogen || A. Nakamura || HYG || align=right | 10 km || 
|-id=963 bgcolor=#d6d6d6
| 24963 ||  || — || October 26, 1997 || Oohira || T. Urata || ALA || align=right | 16 km || 
|-id=964 bgcolor=#d6d6d6
| 24964 ||  || — || October 27, 1997 || Xinglong || SCAP || — || align=right | 8.8 km || 
|-id=965 bgcolor=#d6d6d6
| 24965 Akayu ||  ||  || November 19, 1997 || Nanyo || T. Okuni || — || align=right | 7.7 km || 
|-id=966 bgcolor=#fefefe
| 24966 ||  || — || December 24, 1997 || Oizumi || T. Kobayashi || NYS || align=right | 2.5 km || 
|-id=967 bgcolor=#d6d6d6
| 24967 Frištenský ||  ||  || January 14, 1998 || Ondřejov || L. Kotková || — || align=right | 6.6 km || 
|-id=968 bgcolor=#fefefe
| 24968 Chernyakhovsky ||  ||  || January 23, 1998 || Socorro || LINEAR || FLO || align=right | 2.8 km || 
|-id=969 bgcolor=#E9E9E9
| 24969 Lucafini ||  ||  || February 13, 1998 || San Marcello || L. Tesi, A. Boattini || — || align=right | 4.6 km || 
|-id=970 bgcolor=#FA8072
| 24970 ||  || — || March 25, 1998 || Haleakala || NEAT || — || align=right | 3.0 km || 
|-id=971 bgcolor=#fefefe
| 24971 ||  || — || March 24, 1998 || Socorro || LINEAR || — || align=right | 3.9 km || 
|-id=972 bgcolor=#fefefe
| 24972 ||  || — || March 31, 1998 || Socorro || LINEAR || PHO || align=right | 3.3 km || 
|-id=973 bgcolor=#d6d6d6
| 24973 ||  || — || April 2, 1998 || Socorro || LINEAR || — || align=right | 9.3 km || 
|-id=974 bgcolor=#fefefe
| 24974 Macúch ||  ||  || April 21, 1998 || Modra || P. Kolény, L. Kornoš || — || align=right | 2.2 km || 
|-id=975 bgcolor=#fefefe
| 24975 ||  || — || April 20, 1998 || Socorro || LINEAR || — || align=right | 2.1 km || 
|-id=976 bgcolor=#fefefe
| 24976 Jurajtoth ||  ||  || April 25, 1998 || Anderson Mesa || LONEOS || — || align=right | 2.9 km || 
|-id=977 bgcolor=#fefefe
| 24977 Tongzhan ||  ||  || April 21, 1998 || Socorro || LINEAR || — || align=right | 2.2 km || 
|-id=978 bgcolor=#C2E0FF
| 24978 ||  || — || April 28, 1998 || Mauna Kea || J. X. Luu, C. Trujillo, D. J. Tholen, D. C. Jewitt || cubewano (cold)critical || align=right | 140 km || 
|-id=979 bgcolor=#fefefe
| 24979 ||  || — || May 1, 1998 || Haleakala || NEAT || — || align=right | 4.4 km || 
|-id=980 bgcolor=#fefefe
| 24980 ||  || — || May 22, 1998 || Socorro || LINEAR || — || align=right | 10 km || 
|-id=981 bgcolor=#fefefe
| 24981 Shigekimurakami ||  ||  || May 22, 1998 || Kuma Kogen || A. Nakamura || — || align=right | 2.1 km || 
|-id=982 bgcolor=#d6d6d6
| 24982 ||  || — || May 22, 1998 || Socorro || LINEAR || — || align=right | 7.5 km || 
|-id=983 bgcolor=#E9E9E9
| 24983 ||  || — || May 22, 1998 || Socorro || LINEAR || EUN || align=right | 5.7 km || 
|-id=984 bgcolor=#fefefe
| 24984 Usui ||  ||  || May 27, 1998 || Anderson Mesa || LONEOS || — || align=right | 2.5 km || 
|-id=985 bgcolor=#fefefe
| 24985 Benuri ||  ||  || May 22, 1998 || Socorro || LINEAR || FLO || align=right | 2.0 km || 
|-id=986 bgcolor=#fefefe
| 24986 Yalefan ||  ||  || May 22, 1998 || Socorro || LINEAR || — || align=right | 3.3 km || 
|-id=987 bgcolor=#fefefe
| 24987 ||  || — || May 22, 1998 || Socorro || LINEAR || — || align=right | 3.2 km || 
|-id=988 bgcolor=#fefefe
| 24988 Alainmilsztajn ||  ||  || June 19, 1998 || Caussols || ODAS || — || align=right | 2.2 km || 
|-id=989 bgcolor=#fefefe
| 24989 ||  || — || June 19, 1998 || Socorro || LINEAR || — || align=right | 4.5 km || 
|-id=990 bgcolor=#fefefe
| 24990 ||  || — || June 24, 1998 || Socorro || LINEAR || FLO || align=right | 3.1 km || 
|-id=991 bgcolor=#fefefe
| 24991 ||  || — || June 24, 1998 || Socorro || LINEAR || — || align=right | 2.5 km || 
|-id=992 bgcolor=#fefefe
| 24992 ||  || — || June 24, 1998 || Socorro || LINEAR || — || align=right | 3.4 km || 
|-id=993 bgcolor=#fefefe
| 24993 ||  || — || June 24, 1998 || Socorro || LINEAR || — || align=right | 2.1 km || 
|-id=994 bgcolor=#fefefe
| 24994 Prettyman ||  ||  || June 23, 1998 || Anderson Mesa || LONEOS || — || align=right | 2.7 km || 
|-id=995 bgcolor=#E9E9E9
| 24995 || 1998 OQ || — || July 20, 1998 || Caussols || ODAS || — || align=right | 2.8 km || 
|-id=996 bgcolor=#fefefe
| 24996 ||  || — || July 20, 1998 || San Marcello || V. Goretti, L. Tesi || V || align=right | 2.3 km || 
|-id=997 bgcolor=#fefefe
| 24997 Petergabriel ||  ||  || July 23, 1998 || Caussols || ODAS || — || align=right | 2.3 km || 
|-id=998 bgcolor=#fefefe
| 24998 Hermite ||  ||  || July 28, 1998 || Prescott || P. G. Comba || — || align=right | 2.3 km || 
|-id=999 bgcolor=#E9E9E9
| 24999 Hieronymus ||  ||  || July 24, 1998 || Ondřejov || P. Pravec || — || align=right | 3.8 km || 
|-id=000 bgcolor=#d6d6d6
| 25000 Astrometria ||  ||  || July 28, 1998 || Prescott || P. G. Comba || — || align=right | 17 km || 
|}

References

External links 
 Discovery Circumstances: Numbered Minor Planets (20001)–(25000) (IAU Minor Planet Center)

0024